

241001–241100 

|-bgcolor=#E9E9E9
| 241001 ||  || — || May 23, 2006 || Anderson Mesa || LONEOS || KAZ || align=right | 3.6 km || 
|-id=002 bgcolor=#E9E9E9
| 241002 ||  || — || May 25, 2006 || Kitt Peak || Spacewatch || ADE || align=right | 3.2 km || 
|-id=003 bgcolor=#E9E9E9
| 241003 ||  || — || May 30, 2006 || Kitt Peak || Spacewatch || — || align=right | 1.6 km || 
|-id=004 bgcolor=#E9E9E9
| 241004 ||  || — || May 28, 2006 || Catalina || CSS || — || align=right | 3.0 km || 
|-id=005 bgcolor=#E9E9E9
| 241005 ||  || — || June 4, 2006 || Mount Lemmon || Mount Lemmon Survey || — || align=right | 1.7 km || 
|-id=006 bgcolor=#E9E9E9
| 241006 ||  || — || June 14, 2006 || Siding Spring || SSS || MIT || align=right | 4.2 km || 
|-id=007 bgcolor=#E9E9E9
| 241007 ||  || — || June 16, 2006 || Kitt Peak || Spacewatch || — || align=right | 2.1 km || 
|-id=008 bgcolor=#E9E9E9
| 241008 ||  || — || June 17, 2006 || Kitt Peak || Spacewatch || — || align=right | 3.2 km || 
|-id=009 bgcolor=#E9E9E9
| 241009 ||  || — || June 16, 2006 || Kitt Peak || Spacewatch || — || align=right | 2.1 km || 
|-id=010 bgcolor=#E9E9E9
| 241010 ||  || — || June 16, 2006 || Palomar || NEAT || — || align=right | 1.8 km || 
|-id=011 bgcolor=#E9E9E9
| 241011 ||  || — || July 20, 2006 || Lulin Observatory || LUSS || — || align=right | 3.5 km || 
|-id=012 bgcolor=#E9E9E9
| 241012 ||  || — || July 24, 2006 || Bergisch Gladbach || W. Bickel || — || align=right | 3.0 km || 
|-id=013 bgcolor=#E9E9E9
| 241013 ||  || — || August 14, 2006 || Siding Spring || SSS || — || align=right | 3.2 km || 
|-id=014 bgcolor=#E9E9E9
| 241014 ||  || — || August 11, 2006 || Palomar || NEAT || — || align=right | 2.3 km || 
|-id=015 bgcolor=#E9E9E9
| 241015 ||  || — || August 12, 2006 || Palomar || NEAT || — || align=right | 2.7 km || 
|-id=016 bgcolor=#d6d6d6
| 241016 ||  || — || August 14, 2006 || Siding Spring || SSS || — || align=right | 3.0 km || 
|-id=017 bgcolor=#E9E9E9
| 241017 ||  || — || August 19, 2006 || Palomar || NEAT || — || align=right | 3.2 km || 
|-id=018 bgcolor=#E9E9E9
| 241018 ||  || — || August 16, 2006 || Siding Spring || SSS || AGN || align=right | 2.1 km || 
|-id=019 bgcolor=#E9E9E9
| 241019 ||  || — || August 17, 2006 || Palomar || NEAT || — || align=right | 3.4 km || 
|-id=020 bgcolor=#d6d6d6
| 241020 ||  || — || August 19, 2006 || Palomar || NEAT || EUP || align=right | 6.4 km || 
|-id=021 bgcolor=#d6d6d6
| 241021 ||  || — || August 21, 2006 || Palomar || NEAT || — || align=right | 5.3 km || 
|-id=022 bgcolor=#d6d6d6
| 241022 ||  || — || August 22, 2006 || Pla D'Arguines || R. Ferrando || LIX || align=right | 5.8 km || 
|-id=023 bgcolor=#E9E9E9
| 241023 ||  || — || August 19, 2006 || Palomar || NEAT || DOR || align=right | 3.9 km || 
|-id=024 bgcolor=#E9E9E9
| 241024 ||  || — || August 20, 2006 || Palomar || NEAT || — || align=right | 3.7 km || 
|-id=025 bgcolor=#d6d6d6
| 241025 ||  || — || August 20, 2006 || Palomar || NEAT || — || align=right | 4.1 km || 
|-id=026 bgcolor=#d6d6d6
| 241026 ||  || — || August 24, 2006 || Palomar || NEAT || — || align=right | 4.1 km || 
|-id=027 bgcolor=#d6d6d6
| 241027 ||  || — || August 21, 2006 || Kitt Peak || Spacewatch || — || align=right | 3.5 km || 
|-id=028 bgcolor=#d6d6d6
| 241028 ||  || — || August 24, 2006 || Socorro || LINEAR || — || align=right | 5.2 km || 
|-id=029 bgcolor=#d6d6d6
| 241029 ||  || — || August 27, 2006 || Kitt Peak || Spacewatch || HYG || align=right | 3.7 km || 
|-id=030 bgcolor=#E9E9E9
| 241030 ||  || — || August 16, 2006 || Palomar || NEAT || — || align=right | 2.3 km || 
|-id=031 bgcolor=#E9E9E9
| 241031 ||  || — || August 16, 2006 || Palomar || NEAT || — || align=right | 1.9 km || 
|-id=032 bgcolor=#d6d6d6
| 241032 ||  || — || August 23, 2006 || Palomar || NEAT || — || align=right | 3.7 km || 
|-id=033 bgcolor=#d6d6d6
| 241033 ||  || — || August 28, 2006 || Kitt Peak || Spacewatch || — || align=right | 5.0 km || 
|-id=034 bgcolor=#E9E9E9
| 241034 ||  || — || August 17, 2006 || Palomar || NEAT || MRX || align=right | 1.5 km || 
|-id=035 bgcolor=#d6d6d6
| 241035 ||  || — || August 17, 2006 || Palomar || NEAT || — || align=right | 4.7 km || 
|-id=036 bgcolor=#d6d6d6
| 241036 ||  || — || August 23, 2006 || Socorro || LINEAR || — || align=right | 3.0 km || 
|-id=037 bgcolor=#E9E9E9
| 241037 ||  || — || August 18, 2006 || Palomar || NEAT || CLO || align=right | 2.1 km || 
|-id=038 bgcolor=#E9E9E9
| 241038 ||  || — || August 18, 2006 || Palomar || NEAT || EUN || align=right | 1.9 km || 
|-id=039 bgcolor=#d6d6d6
| 241039 ||  || — || August 19, 2006 || Kitt Peak || Spacewatch || — || align=right | 4.3 km || 
|-id=040 bgcolor=#d6d6d6
| 241040 ||  || — || August 19, 2006 || Kitt Peak || Spacewatch || — || align=right | 2.8 km || 
|-id=041 bgcolor=#d6d6d6
| 241041 ||  || — || September 14, 2006 || Catalina || CSS || EOS || align=right | 2.9 km || 
|-id=042 bgcolor=#d6d6d6
| 241042 ||  || — || September 14, 2006 || Catalina || CSS || — || align=right | 3.0 km || 
|-id=043 bgcolor=#d6d6d6
| 241043 ||  || — || September 15, 2006 || Socorro || LINEAR || — || align=right | 4.3 km || 
|-id=044 bgcolor=#E9E9E9
| 241044 ||  || — || September 12, 2006 || Catalina || CSS || — || align=right | 3.7 km || 
|-id=045 bgcolor=#d6d6d6
| 241045 ||  || — || September 14, 2006 || Kitt Peak || Spacewatch || — || align=right | 5.1 km || 
|-id=046 bgcolor=#d6d6d6
| 241046 ||  || — || September 15, 2006 || Kitt Peak || Spacewatch || THM || align=right | 3.3 km || 
|-id=047 bgcolor=#d6d6d6
| 241047 ||  || — || September 15, 2006 || Kitt Peak || Spacewatch || — || align=right | 2.2 km || 
|-id=048 bgcolor=#d6d6d6
| 241048 ||  || — || September 15, 2006 || Kitt Peak || Spacewatch || 637 || align=right | 2.7 km || 
|-id=049 bgcolor=#d6d6d6
| 241049 ||  || — || September 15, 2006 || Kitt Peak || Spacewatch || — || align=right | 3.9 km || 
|-id=050 bgcolor=#d6d6d6
| 241050 ||  || — || September 14, 2006 || Kitt Peak || Spacewatch || — || align=right | 3.6 km || 
|-id=051 bgcolor=#d6d6d6
| 241051 ||  || — || September 16, 2006 || Palomar || NEAT || HYG || align=right | 3.9 km || 
|-id=052 bgcolor=#d6d6d6
| 241052 ||  || — || September 17, 2006 || Anderson Mesa || LONEOS || — || align=right | 5.2 km || 
|-id=053 bgcolor=#d6d6d6
| 241053 ||  || — || September 18, 2006 || Catalina || CSS || — || align=right | 3.8 km || 
|-id=054 bgcolor=#E9E9E9
| 241054 ||  || — || September 19, 2006 || Kitt Peak || Spacewatch || HOF || align=right | 3.7 km || 
|-id=055 bgcolor=#d6d6d6
| 241055 ||  || — || September 18, 2006 || Kitt Peak || Spacewatch || THM || align=right | 3.8 km || 
|-id=056 bgcolor=#d6d6d6
| 241056 ||  || — || September 19, 2006 || Catalina || CSS || — || align=right | 4.0 km || 
|-id=057 bgcolor=#d6d6d6
| 241057 ||  || — || September 24, 2006 || Kitt Peak || Spacewatch || THM || align=right | 2.8 km || 
|-id=058 bgcolor=#d6d6d6
| 241058 ||  || — || September 20, 2006 || Palomar || NEAT || — || align=right | 3.6 km || 
|-id=059 bgcolor=#d6d6d6
| 241059 ||  || — || September 20, 2006 || Catalina || CSS || — || align=right | 4.8 km || 
|-id=060 bgcolor=#d6d6d6
| 241060 ||  || — || September 25, 2006 || Anderson Mesa || LONEOS || ALA || align=right | 4.8 km || 
|-id=061 bgcolor=#d6d6d6
| 241061 ||  || — || September 25, 2006 || Kitt Peak || Spacewatch || — || align=right | 3.4 km || 
|-id=062 bgcolor=#d6d6d6
| 241062 ||  || — || September 26, 2006 || Kitt Peak || Spacewatch || — || align=right | 4.8 km || 
|-id=063 bgcolor=#d6d6d6
| 241063 ||  || — || September 27, 2006 || Kitt Peak || Spacewatch || HYG || align=right | 4.7 km || 
|-id=064 bgcolor=#d6d6d6
| 241064 ||  || — || September 28, 2006 || Kitt Peak || Spacewatch || — || align=right | 3.2 km || 
|-id=065 bgcolor=#d6d6d6
| 241065 ||  || — || September 28, 2006 || Kitt Peak || Spacewatch || — || align=right | 5.0 km || 
|-id=066 bgcolor=#E9E9E9
| 241066 ||  || — || September 29, 2006 || Mayhill || A. Lowe || GEF || align=right | 4.6 km || 
|-id=067 bgcolor=#E9E9E9
| 241067 ||  || — || September 27, 2006 || Kitt Peak || Spacewatch || HOF || align=right | 3.5 km || 
|-id=068 bgcolor=#d6d6d6
| 241068 ||  || — || September 30, 2006 || Catalina || CSS || — || align=right | 4.9 km || 
|-id=069 bgcolor=#d6d6d6
| 241069 ||  || — || September 16, 2006 || Apache Point || A. C. Becker || — || align=right | 2.7 km || 
|-id=070 bgcolor=#E9E9E9
| 241070 ||  || — || September 17, 2006 || Kitt Peak || Spacewatch || NEM || align=right | 3.4 km || 
|-id=071 bgcolor=#d6d6d6
| 241071 ||  || — || September 25, 2006 || Kitt Peak || Spacewatch || — || align=right | 4.3 km || 
|-id=072 bgcolor=#d6d6d6
| 241072 ||  || — || October 10, 2006 || Palomar || NEAT || ALA || align=right | 5.4 km || 
|-id=073 bgcolor=#d6d6d6
| 241073 ||  || — || October 12, 2006 || Kitt Peak || Spacewatch || — || align=right | 3.2 km || 
|-id=074 bgcolor=#d6d6d6
| 241074 ||  || — || October 12, 2006 || Kitt Peak || Spacewatch || — || align=right | 3.2 km || 
|-id=075 bgcolor=#d6d6d6
| 241075 ||  || — || October 12, 2006 || Palomar || NEAT || TIR || align=right | 4.8 km || 
|-id=076 bgcolor=#d6d6d6
| 241076 ||  || — || October 9, 2006 || Palomar || NEAT || LUT || align=right | 7.3 km || 
|-id=077 bgcolor=#d6d6d6
| 241077 ||  || — || October 11, 2006 || Palomar || NEAT || — || align=right | 4.2 km || 
|-id=078 bgcolor=#d6d6d6
| 241078 ||  || — || October 2, 2006 || Apache Point || A. C. Becker || HYG || align=right | 2.5 km || 
|-id=079 bgcolor=#d6d6d6
| 241079 ||  || — || October 16, 2006 || Catalina || CSS || — || align=right | 6.2 km || 
|-id=080 bgcolor=#d6d6d6
| 241080 ||  || — || October 16, 2006 || Catalina || CSS || — || align=right | 3.4 km || 
|-id=081 bgcolor=#E9E9E9
| 241081 ||  || — || October 16, 2006 || Kitt Peak || Spacewatch || HOF || align=right | 2.8 km || 
|-id=082 bgcolor=#d6d6d6
| 241082 ||  || — || October 16, 2006 || Kitt Peak || Spacewatch || — || align=right | 5.1 km || 
|-id=083 bgcolor=#E9E9E9
| 241083 ||  || — || October 17, 2006 || Kitt Peak || Spacewatch || — || align=right | 4.2 km || 
|-id=084 bgcolor=#E9E9E9
| 241084 ||  || — || October 16, 2006 || Catalina || CSS || — || align=right | 2.9 km || 
|-id=085 bgcolor=#d6d6d6
| 241085 ||  || — || October 20, 2006 || Mount Lemmon || Mount Lemmon Survey || — || align=right | 3.1 km || 
|-id=086 bgcolor=#d6d6d6
| 241086 ||  || — || October 17, 2006 || Catalina || CSS || — || align=right | 4.9 km || 
|-id=087 bgcolor=#d6d6d6
| 241087 ||  || — || October 23, 2006 || Kitt Peak || Spacewatch || — || align=right | 2.5 km || 
|-id=088 bgcolor=#d6d6d6
| 241088 ||  || — || October 27, 2006 || Mount Lemmon || Mount Lemmon Survey || — || align=right | 4.7 km || 
|-id=089 bgcolor=#d6d6d6
| 241089 ||  || — || October 27, 2006 || Catalina || CSS || 7:4 || align=right | 4.8 km || 
|-id=090 bgcolor=#d6d6d6
| 241090 Nemet ||  ||  || October 23, 2006 || Mauna Kea || D. D. Balam || — || align=right | 4.4 km || 
|-id=091 bgcolor=#d6d6d6
| 241091 ||  || — || October 19, 2006 || Kitt Peak || M. W. Buie || THM || align=right | 3.1 km || 
|-id=092 bgcolor=#E9E9E9
| 241092 ||  || — || November 5, 2006 || Palomar || NEAT || DOR || align=right | 4.5 km || 
|-id=093 bgcolor=#d6d6d6
| 241093 ||  || — || November 11, 2006 || Kitt Peak || Spacewatch || SHU3:2 || align=right | 7.7 km || 
|-id=094 bgcolor=#d6d6d6
| 241094 ||  || — || November 16, 2006 || Kitt Peak || Spacewatch || — || align=right | 3.1 km || 
|-id=095 bgcolor=#d6d6d6
| 241095 ||  || — || February 6, 2007 || Mount Lemmon || Mount Lemmon Survey || — || align=right | 3.6 km || 
|-id=096 bgcolor=#fefefe
| 241096 ||  || — || February 25, 2007 || Catalina || CSS || H || align=right data-sort-value="0.99" | 990 m || 
|-id=097 bgcolor=#C2E0FF
| 241097 ||  || — || February 23, 2007 || Kitt Peak || Spacewatch || centaurcritical || align=right | 27 km || 
|-id=098 bgcolor=#fefefe
| 241098 || 2007 GW || — || April 7, 2007 || Catalina || CSS || H || align=right data-sort-value="0.98" | 980 m || 
|-id=099 bgcolor=#C2FFFF
| 241099 ||  || — || April 6, 2007 || Antares || ARO || L5 || align=right | 14 km || 
|-id=100 bgcolor=#fefefe
| 241100 ||  || — || April 11, 2007 || Catalina || CSS || H || align=right data-sort-value="0.87" | 870 m || 
|}

241101–241200 

|-bgcolor=#fefefe
| 241101 ||  || — || April 15, 2007 || Catalina || CSS || — || align=right data-sort-value="0.81" | 810 m || 
|-id=102 bgcolor=#fefefe
| 241102 ||  || — || April 17, 2007 || Siding Spring || SSS || H || align=right | 1.2 km || 
|-id=103 bgcolor=#fefefe
| 241103 ||  || — || April 19, 2007 || Kitt Peak || Spacewatch || — || align=right | 1.5 km || 
|-id=104 bgcolor=#E9E9E9
| 241104 ||  || — || May 7, 2007 || Kitt Peak || Spacewatch || KRM || align=right | 3.6 km || 
|-id=105 bgcolor=#E9E9E9
| 241105 ||  || — || May 10, 2007 || Mount Lemmon || Mount Lemmon Survey || KON || align=right | 3.6 km || 
|-id=106 bgcolor=#E9E9E9
| 241106 ||  || — || May 20, 2007 || Catalina || CSS || — || align=right | 2.9 km || 
|-id=107 bgcolor=#E9E9E9
| 241107 ||  || — || June 10, 2007 || Kitt Peak || Spacewatch || MAR || align=right | 1.7 km || 
|-id=108 bgcolor=#fefefe
| 241108 ||  || — || June 10, 2007 || Kitt Peak || Spacewatch || — || align=right | 1.5 km || 
|-id=109 bgcolor=#FA8072
| 241109 ||  || — || June 21, 2007 || Anderson Mesa || LONEOS || — || align=right data-sort-value="0.99" | 990 m || 
|-id=110 bgcolor=#fefefe
| 241110 ||  || — || July 12, 2007 || La Sagra || OAM Obs. || — || align=right | 1.2 km || 
|-id=111 bgcolor=#fefefe
| 241111 ||  || — || July 15, 2007 || Siding Spring || SSS || V || align=right data-sort-value="0.92" | 920 m || 
|-id=112 bgcolor=#FA8072
| 241112 ||  || — || July 16, 2007 || Socorro || LINEAR || — || align=right | 1.1 km || 
|-id=113 bgcolor=#fefefe
| 241113 Zhongda ||  ||  || July 21, 2007 || Lulin Observatory || Q.-z. Ye, H.-C. Lin || V || align=right data-sort-value="0.94" | 940 m || 
|-id=114 bgcolor=#E9E9E9
| 241114 ||  || — || July 22, 2007 || Lulin || LUSS || — || align=right | 3.2 km || 
|-id=115 bgcolor=#fefefe
| 241115 ||  || — || August 7, 2007 || Eskridge || G. Hug || — || align=right | 1.1 km || 
|-id=116 bgcolor=#E9E9E9
| 241116 ||  || — || August 8, 2007 || Socorro || LINEAR || — || align=right | 1.7 km || 
|-id=117 bgcolor=#fefefe
| 241117 ||  || — || August 5, 2007 || Socorro || LINEAR || NYS || align=right data-sort-value="0.96" | 960 m || 
|-id=118 bgcolor=#fefefe
| 241118 ||  || — || August 8, 2007 || Socorro || LINEAR || — || align=right | 1.3 km || 
|-id=119 bgcolor=#fefefe
| 241119 ||  || — || August 8, 2007 || Socorro || LINEAR || V || align=right | 1.2 km || 
|-id=120 bgcolor=#fefefe
| 241120 ||  || — || August 9, 2007 || Socorro || LINEAR || MAS || align=right data-sort-value="0.94" | 940 m || 
|-id=121 bgcolor=#fefefe
| 241121 ||  || — || August 9, 2007 || Socorro || LINEAR || NYS || align=right | 2.2 km || 
|-id=122 bgcolor=#fefefe
| 241122 ||  || — || August 11, 2007 || Socorro || LINEAR || — || align=right | 1.7 km || 
|-id=123 bgcolor=#fefefe
| 241123 ||  || — || August 12, 2007 || Socorro || LINEAR || V || align=right data-sort-value="0.98" | 980 m || 
|-id=124 bgcolor=#E9E9E9
| 241124 ||  || — || August 12, 2007 || Great Shefford || P. Birtwhistle || — || align=right | 3.0 km || 
|-id=125 bgcolor=#fefefe
| 241125 ||  || — || August 11, 2007 || Socorro || LINEAR || — || align=right | 2.0 km || 
|-id=126 bgcolor=#fefefe
| 241126 ||  || — || August 5, 2007 || Socorro || LINEAR || — || align=right | 1.1 km || 
|-id=127 bgcolor=#fefefe
| 241127 ||  || — || August 8, 2007 || Socorro || LINEAR || MAS || align=right data-sort-value="0.98" | 980 m || 
|-id=128 bgcolor=#fefefe
| 241128 ||  || — || August 9, 2007 || Socorro || LINEAR || NYS || align=right | 1.2 km || 
|-id=129 bgcolor=#E9E9E9
| 241129 ||  || — || August 9, 2007 || Socorro || LINEAR || — || align=right | 5.4 km || 
|-id=130 bgcolor=#fefefe
| 241130 ||  || — || August 15, 2007 || La Sagra || OAM Obs. || NYS || align=right data-sort-value="0.88" | 880 m || 
|-id=131 bgcolor=#fefefe
| 241131 ||  || — || August 12, 2007 || Socorro || LINEAR || — || align=right | 1.1 km || 
|-id=132 bgcolor=#fefefe
| 241132 ||  || — || August 11, 2007 || Socorro || LINEAR || — || align=right | 1.4 km || 
|-id=133 bgcolor=#d6d6d6
| 241133 ||  || — || August 13, 2007 || Siding Spring || SSS || — || align=right | 4.9 km || 
|-id=134 bgcolor=#fefefe
| 241134 ||  || — || August 21, 2007 || Anderson Mesa || LONEOS || NYS || align=right | 2.3 km || 
|-id=135 bgcolor=#fefefe
| 241135 ||  || — || August 21, 2007 || Anderson Mesa || LONEOS || NYS || align=right data-sort-value="0.80" | 800 m || 
|-id=136 bgcolor=#E9E9E9
| 241136 Sandstede ||  ||  || August 25, 2007 || Taunus || S. Karge, R. Kling || — || align=right | 3.0 km || 
|-id=137 bgcolor=#fefefe
| 241137 ||  || — || August 24, 2007 || Kitt Peak || Spacewatch || — || align=right data-sort-value="0.73" | 730 m || 
|-id=138 bgcolor=#fefefe
| 241138 ||  || — || August 16, 2007 || Purple Mountain || PMO NEO || V || align=right | 1.1 km || 
|-id=139 bgcolor=#d6d6d6
| 241139 ||  || — || August 23, 2007 || Kitt Peak || Spacewatch || — || align=right | 3.0 km || 
|-id=140 bgcolor=#fefefe
| 241140 ||  || — || August 17, 2007 || Socorro || LINEAR || — || align=right | 1.6 km || 
|-id=141 bgcolor=#fefefe
| 241141 ||  || — || September 5, 2007 || Dauban || Chante-Perdrix Obs. || FLO || align=right | 1.0 km || 
|-id=142 bgcolor=#fefefe
| 241142 ||  || — || September 6, 2007 || Dauban || Chante-Perdrix Obs. || — || align=right | 1.7 km || 
|-id=143 bgcolor=#E9E9E9
| 241143 ||  || — || September 11, 2007 || Dauban || Chante-Perdrix Obs. || — || align=right | 1.9 km || 
|-id=144 bgcolor=#fefefe
| 241144 ||  || — || September 3, 2007 || Catalina || CSS || — || align=right data-sort-value="0.76" | 760 m || 
|-id=145 bgcolor=#fefefe
| 241145 ||  || — || September 3, 2007 || Catalina || CSS || NYS || align=right data-sort-value="0.96" | 960 m || 
|-id=146 bgcolor=#fefefe
| 241146 ||  || — || September 3, 2007 || Catalina || CSS || — || align=right | 1.2 km || 
|-id=147 bgcolor=#fefefe
| 241147 ||  || — || September 3, 2007 || Catalina || CSS || — || align=right | 1.5 km || 
|-id=148 bgcolor=#fefefe
| 241148 ||  || — || September 5, 2007 || Catalina || CSS || — || align=right | 2.6 km || 
|-id=149 bgcolor=#fefefe
| 241149 ||  || — || September 5, 2007 || Catalina || CSS || — || align=right | 1.7 km || 
|-id=150 bgcolor=#fefefe
| 241150 ||  || — || September 8, 2007 || Anderson Mesa || LONEOS || — || align=right | 1.9 km || 
|-id=151 bgcolor=#fefefe
| 241151 ||  || — || September 8, 2007 || Anderson Mesa || LONEOS || — || align=right | 1.0 km || 
|-id=152 bgcolor=#d6d6d6
| 241152 ||  || — || September 8, 2007 || Anderson Mesa || LONEOS || — || align=right | 5.4 km || 
|-id=153 bgcolor=#fefefe
| 241153 Omegagigia ||  ||  || September 8, 2007 || La Cañada || J. Lacruz || — || align=right data-sort-value="0.93" | 930 m || 
|-id=154 bgcolor=#d6d6d6
| 241154 ||  || — || September 9, 2007 || Mount Lemmon || Mount Lemmon Survey || — || align=right | 4.2 km || 
|-id=155 bgcolor=#d6d6d6
| 241155 ||  || — || September 9, 2007 || Anderson Mesa || LONEOS || — || align=right | 3.8 km || 
|-id=156 bgcolor=#E9E9E9
| 241156 ||  || — || September 10, 2007 || Mount Lemmon || Mount Lemmon Survey || AST || align=right | 1.8 km || 
|-id=157 bgcolor=#E9E9E9
| 241157 ||  || — || September 10, 2007 || Mount Lemmon || Mount Lemmon Survey || — || align=right | 2.2 km || 
|-id=158 bgcolor=#d6d6d6
| 241158 ||  || — || September 10, 2007 || Mount Lemmon || Mount Lemmon Survey || — || align=right | 5.3 km || 
|-id=159 bgcolor=#fefefe
| 241159 ||  || — || September 10, 2007 || Mount Lemmon || Mount Lemmon Survey || — || align=right | 1.1 km || 
|-id=160 bgcolor=#d6d6d6
| 241160 ||  || — || September 10, 2007 || Mount Lemmon || Mount Lemmon Survey || SAN || align=right | 2.2 km || 
|-id=161 bgcolor=#fefefe
| 241161 ||  || — || September 10, 2007 || Kitt Peak || Spacewatch || NYS || align=right | 2.1 km || 
|-id=162 bgcolor=#fefefe
| 241162 ||  || — || September 10, 2007 || Kitt Peak || Spacewatch || — || align=right | 1.7 km || 
|-id=163 bgcolor=#E9E9E9
| 241163 ||  || — || September 11, 2007 || Mount Lemmon || Mount Lemmon Survey || WIT || align=right | 1.6 km || 
|-id=164 bgcolor=#E9E9E9
| 241164 ||  || — || September 11, 2007 || Kitt Peak || Spacewatch || AGN || align=right | 1.5 km || 
|-id=165 bgcolor=#fefefe
| 241165 ||  || — || September 12, 2007 || Anderson Mesa || LONEOS || ERI || align=right | 2.5 km || 
|-id=166 bgcolor=#fefefe
| 241166 ||  || — || September 12, 2007 || Anderson Mesa || LONEOS || — || align=right | 1.2 km || 
|-id=167 bgcolor=#E9E9E9
| 241167 ||  || — || September 14, 2007 || Socorro || LINEAR || — || align=right | 3.7 km || 
|-id=168 bgcolor=#fefefe
| 241168 ||  || — || September 15, 2007 || Socorro || LINEAR || NYS || align=right | 1.1 km || 
|-id=169 bgcolor=#d6d6d6
| 241169 ||  || — || September 12, 2007 || Catalina || CSS || KOR || align=right | 2.3 km || 
|-id=170 bgcolor=#fefefe
| 241170 ||  || — || September 9, 2007 || Anderson Mesa || LONEOS || — || align=right | 1.3 km || 
|-id=171 bgcolor=#fefefe
| 241171 ||  || — || September 10, 2007 || Kitt Peak || Spacewatch || — || align=right data-sort-value="0.92" | 920 m || 
|-id=172 bgcolor=#E9E9E9
| 241172 ||  || — || September 9, 2007 || Kitt Peak || Spacewatch || WIT || align=right | 1.4 km || 
|-id=173 bgcolor=#d6d6d6
| 241173 ||  || — || September 10, 2007 || Kitt Peak || Spacewatch || — || align=right | 2.8 km || 
|-id=174 bgcolor=#fefefe
| 241174 ||  || — || September 11, 2007 || Kitt Peak || Spacewatch || — || align=right | 1.1 km || 
|-id=175 bgcolor=#fefefe
| 241175 ||  || — || September 13, 2007 || Anderson Mesa || LONEOS || NYS || align=right | 1.0 km || 
|-id=176 bgcolor=#E9E9E9
| 241176 ||  || — || September 14, 2007 || Mount Lemmon || Mount Lemmon Survey || HOF || align=right | 2.8 km || 
|-id=177 bgcolor=#d6d6d6
| 241177 ||  || — || September 10, 2007 || Mount Lemmon || Mount Lemmon Survey || — || align=right | 3.4 km || 
|-id=178 bgcolor=#fefefe
| 241178 ||  || — || September 12, 2007 || Catalina || CSS || — || align=right | 1.3 km || 
|-id=179 bgcolor=#fefefe
| 241179 ||  || — || September 12, 2007 || Catalina || CSS || — || align=right | 1.1 km || 
|-id=180 bgcolor=#E9E9E9
| 241180 ||  || — || September 15, 2007 || Socorro || LINEAR || MRX || align=right | 1.7 km || 
|-id=181 bgcolor=#fefefe
| 241181 ||  || — || September 15, 2007 || Socorro || LINEAR || — || align=right | 1.5 km || 
|-id=182 bgcolor=#E9E9E9
| 241182 ||  || — || September 11, 2007 || Kitt Peak || Spacewatch || — || align=right data-sort-value="0.96" | 960 m || 
|-id=183 bgcolor=#E9E9E9
| 241183 ||  || — || September 12, 2007 || Catalina || CSS || — || align=right | 3.5 km || 
|-id=184 bgcolor=#fefefe
| 241184 ||  || — || September 14, 2007 || Catalina || CSS || V || align=right | 1.3 km || 
|-id=185 bgcolor=#fefefe
| 241185 ||  || — || September 14, 2007 || Catalina || CSS || — || align=right | 1.7 km || 
|-id=186 bgcolor=#d6d6d6
| 241186 ||  || — || September 13, 2007 || Mount Lemmon || Mount Lemmon Survey || — || align=right | 3.8 km || 
|-id=187 bgcolor=#d6d6d6
| 241187 ||  || — || September 9, 2007 || Kitt Peak || Spacewatch || KOR || align=right | 2.2 km || 
|-id=188 bgcolor=#d6d6d6
| 241188 ||  || — || September 12, 2007 || Mount Lemmon || Mount Lemmon Survey || THM || align=right | 2.7 km || 
|-id=189 bgcolor=#E9E9E9
| 241189 ||  || — || September 12, 2007 || Mount Lemmon || Mount Lemmon Survey || — || align=right | 1.3 km || 
|-id=190 bgcolor=#E9E9E9
| 241190 ||  || — || September 10, 2007 || Mount Lemmon || Mount Lemmon Survey || — || align=right | 1.8 km || 
|-id=191 bgcolor=#d6d6d6
| 241191 ||  || — || September 10, 2007 || Mount Lemmon || Mount Lemmon Survey || KAR || align=right | 1.1 km || 
|-id=192 bgcolor=#fefefe
| 241192 Pulyny ||  ||  || September 21, 2007 || Andrushivka || Andrushivka Obs. || V || align=right data-sort-value="0.98" | 980 m || 
|-id=193 bgcolor=#fefefe
| 241193 ||  || — || September 18, 2007 || Kitt Peak || Spacewatch || NYS || align=right | 1.0 km || 
|-id=194 bgcolor=#E9E9E9
| 241194 ||  || — || September 21, 2007 || Bergisch Gladbac || W. Bickel || — || align=right | 1.9 km || 
|-id=195 bgcolor=#E9E9E9
| 241195 ||  || — || September 30, 2007 || Kitt Peak || Spacewatch || MRX || align=right | 1.4 km || 
|-id=196 bgcolor=#d6d6d6
| 241196 ||  || — || September 27, 2007 || Mount Lemmon || Mount Lemmon Survey || — || align=right | 3.3 km || 
|-id=197 bgcolor=#E9E9E9
| 241197 ||  || — || September 21, 2007 || Purple Mountain || PMO NEO || HOF || align=right | 3.6 km || 
|-id=198 bgcolor=#fefefe
| 241198 ||  || — || October 6, 2007 || 7300 Observatory || W. K. Y. Yeung || NYS || align=right data-sort-value="0.78" | 780 m || 
|-id=199 bgcolor=#E9E9E9
| 241199 ||  || — || October 6, 2007 || Socorro || LINEAR || HOF || align=right | 3.6 km || 
|-id=200 bgcolor=#E9E9E9
| 241200 ||  || — || October 6, 2007 || Socorro || LINEAR || — || align=right | 1.9 km || 
|}

241201–241300 

|-bgcolor=#E9E9E9
| 241201 ||  || — || October 8, 2007 || Socorro || LINEAR || — || align=right | 4.0 km || 
|-id=202 bgcolor=#d6d6d6
| 241202 ||  || — || October 4, 2007 || Kitt Peak || Spacewatch || — || align=right | 3.5 km || 
|-id=203 bgcolor=#E9E9E9
| 241203 ||  || — || October 4, 2007 || Kitt Peak || Spacewatch || — || align=right | 1.9 km || 
|-id=204 bgcolor=#E9E9E9
| 241204 ||  || — || October 4, 2007 || Kitt Peak || Spacewatch || — || align=right | 1.9 km || 
|-id=205 bgcolor=#d6d6d6
| 241205 ||  || — || October 4, 2007 || Kitt Peak || Spacewatch || — || align=right | 4.2 km || 
|-id=206 bgcolor=#E9E9E9
| 241206 ||  || — || October 6, 2007 || Kitt Peak || Spacewatch || — || align=right | 3.8 km || 
|-id=207 bgcolor=#d6d6d6
| 241207 ||  || — || October 6, 2007 || Kitt Peak || Spacewatch || HYG || align=right | 4.3 km || 
|-id=208 bgcolor=#d6d6d6
| 241208 ||  || — || October 6, 2007 || Kitt Peak || Spacewatch || — || align=right | 5.3 km || 
|-id=209 bgcolor=#E9E9E9
| 241209 ||  || — || October 7, 2007 || Mount Lemmon || Mount Lemmon Survey || — || align=right | 3.0 km || 
|-id=210 bgcolor=#d6d6d6
| 241210 ||  || — || October 7, 2007 || Mount Lemmon || Mount Lemmon Survey || — || align=right | 3.6 km || 
|-id=211 bgcolor=#E9E9E9
| 241211 ||  || — || October 7, 2007 || Catalina || CSS || WIT || align=right | 1.6 km || 
|-id=212 bgcolor=#E9E9E9
| 241212 ||  || — || October 4, 2007 || Kitt Peak || Spacewatch || — || align=right | 3.1 km || 
|-id=213 bgcolor=#d6d6d6
| 241213 ||  || — || October 7, 2007 || Mount Lemmon || Mount Lemmon Survey || — || align=right | 3.0 km || 
|-id=214 bgcolor=#E9E9E9
| 241214 ||  || — || October 7, 2007 || Mount Lemmon || Mount Lemmon Survey || HOF || align=right | 3.0 km || 
|-id=215 bgcolor=#d6d6d6
| 241215 ||  || — || October 7, 2007 || Mount Lemmon || Mount Lemmon Survey || — || align=right | 2.7 km || 
|-id=216 bgcolor=#d6d6d6
| 241216 ||  || — || October 7, 2007 || Mount Lemmon || Mount Lemmon Survey || — || align=right | 3.6 km || 
|-id=217 bgcolor=#d6d6d6
| 241217 ||  || — || October 7, 2007 || Mount Lemmon || Mount Lemmon Survey || URS || align=right | 6.1 km || 
|-id=218 bgcolor=#E9E9E9
| 241218 ||  || — || October 12, 2007 || 7300 || W. K. Y. Yeung || HOF || align=right | 3.5 km || 
|-id=219 bgcolor=#E9E9E9
| 241219 ||  || — || October 13, 2007 || Mayhill || A. Lowe || — || align=right | 4.1 km || 
|-id=220 bgcolor=#fefefe
| 241220 ||  || — || October 7, 2007 || Catalina || CSS || MAS || align=right | 1.0 km || 
|-id=221 bgcolor=#d6d6d6
| 241221 ||  || — || October 7, 2007 || Catalina || CSS || KOR || align=right | 2.1 km || 
|-id=222 bgcolor=#E9E9E9
| 241222 ||  || — || October 6, 2007 || Kitt Peak || Spacewatch || — || align=right | 2.6 km || 
|-id=223 bgcolor=#d6d6d6
| 241223 ||  || — || October 7, 2007 || Catalina || CSS || TIR || align=right | 4.1 km || 
|-id=224 bgcolor=#d6d6d6
| 241224 ||  || — || October 8, 2007 || Mount Lemmon || Mount Lemmon Survey || — || align=right | 3.2 km || 
|-id=225 bgcolor=#E9E9E9
| 241225 ||  || — || October 8, 2007 || Catalina || CSS || EUN || align=right | 2.0 km || 
|-id=226 bgcolor=#d6d6d6
| 241226 ||  || — || October 4, 2007 || Kitt Peak || Spacewatch || — || align=right | 3.2 km || 
|-id=227 bgcolor=#E9E9E9
| 241227 ||  || — || October 6, 2007 || Kitt Peak || Spacewatch || — || align=right | 1.9 km || 
|-id=228 bgcolor=#d6d6d6
| 241228 ||  || — || October 6, 2007 || Socorro || LINEAR || — || align=right | 3.0 km || 
|-id=229 bgcolor=#E9E9E9
| 241229 ||  || — || October 8, 2007 || Socorro || LINEAR || — || align=right | 3.3 km || 
|-id=230 bgcolor=#d6d6d6
| 241230 ||  || — || October 11, 2007 || Socorro || LINEAR || KOR || align=right | 2.0 km || 
|-id=231 bgcolor=#E9E9E9
| 241231 ||  || — || October 12, 2007 || Socorro || LINEAR || — || align=right | 1.6 km || 
|-id=232 bgcolor=#E9E9E9
| 241232 ||  || — || October 6, 2007 || Kitt Peak || Spacewatch || — || align=right | 1.9 km || 
|-id=233 bgcolor=#d6d6d6
| 241233 ||  || — || October 7, 2007 || Mount Lemmon || Mount Lemmon Survey || — || align=right | 2.9 km || 
|-id=234 bgcolor=#E9E9E9
| 241234 ||  || — || October 13, 2007 || Socorro || LINEAR || EUN || align=right | 1.5 km || 
|-id=235 bgcolor=#E9E9E9
| 241235 ||  || — || October 13, 2007 || Kitt Peak || Spacewatch || HOF || align=right | 2.9 km || 
|-id=236 bgcolor=#E9E9E9
| 241236 ||  || — || October 4, 2007 || Mount Lemmon || Mount Lemmon Survey || — || align=right | 1.8 km || 
|-id=237 bgcolor=#E9E9E9
| 241237 ||  || — || October 5, 2007 || Kitt Peak || Spacewatch || — || align=right | 1.9 km || 
|-id=238 bgcolor=#d6d6d6
| 241238 ||  || — || October 7, 2007 || Catalina || CSS || — || align=right | 3.8 km || 
|-id=239 bgcolor=#E9E9E9
| 241239 ||  || — || October 7, 2007 || Catalina || CSS || — || align=right | 3.2 km || 
|-id=240 bgcolor=#E9E9E9
| 241240 ||  || — || October 8, 2007 || Kitt Peak || Spacewatch || — || align=right | 2.5 km || 
|-id=241 bgcolor=#d6d6d6
| 241241 ||  || — || October 8, 2007 || Mount Lemmon || Mount Lemmon Survey || — || align=right | 3.6 km || 
|-id=242 bgcolor=#E9E9E9
| 241242 ||  || — || October 10, 2007 || Catalina || CSS || WIT || align=right | 1.2 km || 
|-id=243 bgcolor=#d6d6d6
| 241243 ||  || — || October 10, 2007 || Mount Lemmon || Mount Lemmon Survey || KOR || align=right | 1.7 km || 
|-id=244 bgcolor=#d6d6d6
| 241244 ||  || — || October 7, 2007 || Kitt Peak || Spacewatch || — || align=right | 7.1 km || 
|-id=245 bgcolor=#fefefe
| 241245 ||  || — || October 7, 2007 || Kitt Peak || Spacewatch || FLO || align=right | 1.3 km || 
|-id=246 bgcolor=#E9E9E9
| 241246 ||  || — || October 8, 2007 || Kitt Peak || Spacewatch || — || align=right | 3.1 km || 
|-id=247 bgcolor=#d6d6d6
| 241247 ||  || — || October 8, 2007 || Kitt Peak || Spacewatch || KOR || align=right | 1.7 km || 
|-id=248 bgcolor=#E9E9E9
| 241248 ||  || — || October 8, 2007 || Kitt Peak || Spacewatch || — || align=right | 1.9 km || 
|-id=249 bgcolor=#d6d6d6
| 241249 ||  || — || October 8, 2007 || Kitt Peak || Spacewatch || THM || align=right | 3.0 km || 
|-id=250 bgcolor=#E9E9E9
| 241250 ||  || — || October 8, 2007 || Kitt Peak || Spacewatch || — || align=right | 2.5 km || 
|-id=251 bgcolor=#E9E9E9
| 241251 ||  || — || October 8, 2007 || Purple Mountain || PMO NEO || — || align=right | 3.7 km || 
|-id=252 bgcolor=#fefefe
| 241252 ||  || — || October 9, 2007 || Mount Lemmon || Mount Lemmon Survey || KLI || align=right | 2.2 km || 
|-id=253 bgcolor=#d6d6d6
| 241253 ||  || — || October 9, 2007 || Kitt Peak || Spacewatch || — || align=right | 3.6 km || 
|-id=254 bgcolor=#d6d6d6
| 241254 ||  || — || October 12, 2007 || Mount Lemmon || Mount Lemmon Survey || — || align=right | 2.9 km || 
|-id=255 bgcolor=#E9E9E9
| 241255 ||  || — || October 12, 2007 || Mount Lemmon || Mount Lemmon Survey || — || align=right | 2.6 km || 
|-id=256 bgcolor=#E9E9E9
| 241256 ||  || — || October 11, 2007 || Catalina || CSS || — || align=right | 2.4 km || 
|-id=257 bgcolor=#E9E9E9
| 241257 ||  || — || October 12, 2007 || Kitt Peak || Spacewatch || — || align=right | 2.2 km || 
|-id=258 bgcolor=#d6d6d6
| 241258 ||  || — || October 11, 2007 || Kitt Peak || Spacewatch || KOR || align=right | 1.8 km || 
|-id=259 bgcolor=#fefefe
| 241259 ||  || — || October 12, 2007 || Mount Lemmon || Mount Lemmon Survey || — || align=right | 1.3 km || 
|-id=260 bgcolor=#d6d6d6
| 241260 ||  || — || October 12, 2007 || Kitt Peak || Spacewatch || — || align=right | 7.0 km || 
|-id=261 bgcolor=#fefefe
| 241261 ||  || — || October 11, 2007 || Kitt Peak || Spacewatch || CIM || align=right | 3.1 km || 
|-id=262 bgcolor=#E9E9E9
| 241262 ||  || — || October 8, 2007 || Mount Lemmon || Mount Lemmon Survey || — || align=right | 1.2 km || 
|-id=263 bgcolor=#fefefe
| 241263 ||  || — || October 14, 2007 || Mount Lemmon || Mount Lemmon Survey || MAS || align=right | 1.2 km || 
|-id=264 bgcolor=#E9E9E9
| 241264 ||  || — || October 13, 2007 || Catalina || CSS || PAD || align=right | 3.2 km || 
|-id=265 bgcolor=#E9E9E9
| 241265 ||  || — || October 14, 2007 || Kitt Peak || Spacewatch || — || align=right | 1.7 km || 
|-id=266 bgcolor=#E9E9E9
| 241266 ||  || — || October 13, 2007 || Catalina || CSS || HOF || align=right | 3.0 km || 
|-id=267 bgcolor=#E9E9E9
| 241267 ||  || — || October 13, 2007 || Mount Lemmon || Mount Lemmon Survey || — || align=right | 2.9 km || 
|-id=268 bgcolor=#d6d6d6
| 241268 ||  || — || October 15, 2007 || Kitt Peak || Spacewatch || — || align=right | 4.6 km || 
|-id=269 bgcolor=#E9E9E9
| 241269 ||  || — || October 15, 2007 || Kitt Peak || Spacewatch || — || align=right | 3.8 km || 
|-id=270 bgcolor=#E9E9E9
| 241270 ||  || — || October 15, 2007 || Anderson Mesa || LONEOS || — || align=right | 4.7 km || 
|-id=271 bgcolor=#d6d6d6
| 241271 ||  || — || October 15, 2007 || Catalina || CSS || — || align=right | 4.8 km || 
|-id=272 bgcolor=#fefefe
| 241272 ||  || — || October 10, 2007 || Kitt Peak || Spacewatch || NYS || align=right data-sort-value="0.87" | 870 m || 
|-id=273 bgcolor=#E9E9E9
| 241273 ||  || — || October 7, 2007 || Mount Lemmon || Mount Lemmon Survey || — || align=right | 3.0 km || 
|-id=274 bgcolor=#d6d6d6
| 241274 ||  || — || October 8, 2007 || Kitt Peak || Spacewatch || — || align=right | 3.7 km || 
|-id=275 bgcolor=#d6d6d6
| 241275 ||  || — || October 7, 2007 || Mount Lemmon || Mount Lemmon Survey || — || align=right | 4.1 km || 
|-id=276 bgcolor=#d6d6d6
| 241276 Guntramlampert ||  ||  || October 7, 2007 || Gaisberg || R. Gierlinger || — || align=right | 2.9 km || 
|-id=277 bgcolor=#fefefe
| 241277 ||  || — || October 13, 2007 || Socorro || LINEAR || NYS || align=right data-sort-value="0.88" | 880 m || 
|-id=278 bgcolor=#E9E9E9
| 241278 ||  || — || October 13, 2007 || Socorro || LINEAR || — || align=right | 3.6 km || 
|-id=279 bgcolor=#E9E9E9
| 241279 ||  || — || October 8, 2007 || Mount Lemmon || Mount Lemmon Survey || MAR || align=right | 1.4 km || 
|-id=280 bgcolor=#d6d6d6
| 241280 ||  || — || October 16, 2007 || Bisei SG Center || BATTeRS || HYG || align=right | 4.4 km || 
|-id=281 bgcolor=#FA8072
| 241281 ||  || — || October 18, 2007 || Mayhill || A. Lowe || — || align=right | 1.3 km || 
|-id=282 bgcolor=#E9E9E9
| 241282 ||  || — || October 18, 2007 || Socorro || LINEAR || — || align=right | 2.7 km || 
|-id=283 bgcolor=#E9E9E9
| 241283 ||  || — || October 17, 2007 || Anderson Mesa || LONEOS || WIT || align=right | 1.5 km || 
|-id=284 bgcolor=#E9E9E9
| 241284 ||  || — || October 19, 2007 || Socorro || LINEAR || — || align=right | 3.1 km || 
|-id=285 bgcolor=#d6d6d6
| 241285 ||  || — || October 16, 2007 || Mount Lemmon || Mount Lemmon Survey || — || align=right | 2.2 km || 
|-id=286 bgcolor=#fefefe
| 241286 ||  || — || October 18, 2007 || Catalina || CSS || ERI || align=right | 3.1 km || 
|-id=287 bgcolor=#d6d6d6
| 241287 ||  || — || October 18, 2007 || Mount Lemmon || Mount Lemmon Survey || KOR || align=right | 1.7 km || 
|-id=288 bgcolor=#E9E9E9
| 241288 ||  || — || October 19, 2007 || Catalina || CSS || — || align=right | 3.9 km || 
|-id=289 bgcolor=#fefefe
| 241289 ||  || — || October 19, 2007 || Mount Lemmon || Mount Lemmon Survey || NYS || align=right data-sort-value="0.82" | 820 m || 
|-id=290 bgcolor=#d6d6d6
| 241290 ||  || — || October 18, 2007 || Mount Lemmon || Mount Lemmon Survey || — || align=right | 2.8 km || 
|-id=291 bgcolor=#d6d6d6
| 241291 ||  || — || October 18, 2007 || Mount Lemmon || Mount Lemmon Survey || — || align=right | 3.8 km || 
|-id=292 bgcolor=#E9E9E9
| 241292 ||  || — || October 24, 2007 || Mount Lemmon || Mount Lemmon Survey || — || align=right | 1.4 km || 
|-id=293 bgcolor=#d6d6d6
| 241293 ||  || — || October 24, 2007 || Mount Lemmon || Mount Lemmon Survey || — || align=right | 5.2 km || 
|-id=294 bgcolor=#d6d6d6
| 241294 ||  || — || October 24, 2007 || Mount Lemmon || Mount Lemmon Survey || URS || align=right | 5.6 km || 
|-id=295 bgcolor=#d6d6d6
| 241295 ||  || — || October 24, 2007 || Mount Lemmon || Mount Lemmon Survey || EOS || align=right | 3.5 km || 
|-id=296 bgcolor=#d6d6d6
| 241296 ||  || — || October 24, 2007 || Mount Lemmon || Mount Lemmon Survey || — || align=right | 3.3 km || 
|-id=297 bgcolor=#d6d6d6
| 241297 ||  || — || October 30, 2007 || Mount Lemmon || Mount Lemmon Survey || — || align=right | 3.1 km || 
|-id=298 bgcolor=#d6d6d6
| 241298 ||  || — || October 30, 2007 || Kitt Peak || Spacewatch || THM || align=right | 2.9 km || 
|-id=299 bgcolor=#d6d6d6
| 241299 ||  || — || October 30, 2007 || Mount Lemmon || Mount Lemmon Survey || — || align=right | 2.8 km || 
|-id=300 bgcolor=#fefefe
| 241300 ||  || — || October 30, 2007 || Kitt Peak || Spacewatch || — || align=right | 1.0 km || 
|}

241301–241400 

|-bgcolor=#E9E9E9
| 241301 ||  || — || October 30, 2007 || Mount Lemmon || Mount Lemmon Survey || MRX || align=right | 1.5 km || 
|-id=302 bgcolor=#E9E9E9
| 241302 ||  || — || October 30, 2007 || Mount Lemmon || Mount Lemmon Survey || — || align=right | 3.2 km || 
|-id=303 bgcolor=#d6d6d6
| 241303 ||  || — || October 30, 2007 || Mount Lemmon || Mount Lemmon Survey || — || align=right | 4.3 km || 
|-id=304 bgcolor=#d6d6d6
| 241304 ||  || — || October 30, 2007 || Kitt Peak || Spacewatch || — || align=right | 5.4 km || 
|-id=305 bgcolor=#d6d6d6
| 241305 ||  || — || October 31, 2007 || Kitt Peak || Spacewatch || — || align=right | 5.8 km || 
|-id=306 bgcolor=#d6d6d6
| 241306 ||  || — || October 20, 2007 || Kitt Peak || Spacewatch || HYG || align=right | 3.3 km || 
|-id=307 bgcolor=#d6d6d6
| 241307 ||  || — || October 30, 2007 || Catalina || CSS || — || align=right | 5.1 km || 
|-id=308 bgcolor=#d6d6d6
| 241308 ||  || — || November 1, 2007 || Kitt Peak || Spacewatch || — || align=right | 3.6 km || 
|-id=309 bgcolor=#d6d6d6
| 241309 ||  || — || November 2, 2007 || La Cañada || J. Lacruz || KOR || align=right | 1.7 km || 
|-id=310 bgcolor=#d6d6d6
| 241310 ||  || — || November 2, 2007 || La Cañada || J. Lacruz || KOR || align=right | 1.7 km || 
|-id=311 bgcolor=#d6d6d6
| 241311 ||  || — || November 2, 2007 || Goodricke-Pigott || R. A. Tucker || — || align=right | 5.6 km || 
|-id=312 bgcolor=#d6d6d6
| 241312 ||  || — || November 1, 2007 || Mount Lemmon || Mount Lemmon Survey || KOR || align=right | 1.5 km || 
|-id=313 bgcolor=#E9E9E9
| 241313 ||  || — || November 2, 2007 || Mount Lemmon || Mount Lemmon Survey || — || align=right | 2.6 km || 
|-id=314 bgcolor=#E9E9E9
| 241314 ||  || — || November 2, 2007 || Kitt Peak || Spacewatch || — || align=right | 2.3 km || 
|-id=315 bgcolor=#E9E9E9
| 241315 ||  || — || November 1, 2007 || Mount Lemmon || Mount Lemmon Survey || — || align=right | 2.1 km || 
|-id=316 bgcolor=#E9E9E9
| 241316 ||  || — || November 1, 2007 || Kitt Peak || Spacewatch || HOF || align=right | 3.3 km || 
|-id=317 bgcolor=#d6d6d6
| 241317 ||  || — || November 1, 2007 || Kitt Peak || Spacewatch || — || align=right | 4.1 km || 
|-id=318 bgcolor=#d6d6d6
| 241318 ||  || — || November 4, 2007 || Mount Lemmon || Mount Lemmon Survey || — || align=right | 2.9 km || 
|-id=319 bgcolor=#E9E9E9
| 241319 ||  || — || November 2, 2007 || 7300 || W. K. Y. Yeung || — || align=right | 2.0 km || 
|-id=320 bgcolor=#E9E9E9
| 241320 ||  || — || November 2, 2007 || Socorro || LINEAR || — || align=right | 1.9 km || 
|-id=321 bgcolor=#d6d6d6
| 241321 ||  || — || November 7, 2007 || Bisei SG Center || BATTeRS || EOS || align=right | 2.7 km || 
|-id=322 bgcolor=#fefefe
| 241322 ||  || — || November 2, 2007 || Kitt Peak || Spacewatch || — || align=right | 1.3 km || 
|-id=323 bgcolor=#d6d6d6
| 241323 ||  || — || November 3, 2007 || Kitt Peak || Spacewatch || K-2 || align=right | 1.7 km || 
|-id=324 bgcolor=#d6d6d6
| 241324 ||  || — || November 3, 2007 || Kitt Peak || Spacewatch || — || align=right | 2.8 km || 
|-id=325 bgcolor=#d6d6d6
| 241325 ||  || — || November 3, 2007 || Kitt Peak || Spacewatch || — || align=right | 4.0 km || 
|-id=326 bgcolor=#E9E9E9
| 241326 ||  || — || November 11, 2007 || Bisei SG Center || BATTeRS || — || align=right | 3.2 km || 
|-id=327 bgcolor=#E9E9E9
| 241327 ||  || — || November 3, 2007 || Anderson Mesa || LONEOS || AGN || align=right | 1.6 km || 
|-id=328 bgcolor=#d6d6d6
| 241328 ||  || — || November 5, 2007 || Kitt Peak || Spacewatch || EOS || align=right | 2.6 km || 
|-id=329 bgcolor=#d6d6d6
| 241329 ||  || — || November 5, 2007 || Kitt Peak || Spacewatch || — || align=right | 4.9 km || 
|-id=330 bgcolor=#E9E9E9
| 241330 ||  || — || November 5, 2007 || Kitt Peak || Spacewatch || — || align=right | 3.6 km || 
|-id=331 bgcolor=#d6d6d6
| 241331 ||  || — || November 5, 2007 || Kitt Peak || Spacewatch || — || align=right | 4.6 km || 
|-id=332 bgcolor=#d6d6d6
| 241332 ||  || — || November 9, 2007 || Mount Lemmon || Mount Lemmon Survey || — || align=right | 2.7 km || 
|-id=333 bgcolor=#E9E9E9
| 241333 ||  || — || November 7, 2007 || Catalina || CSS || — || align=right | 3.3 km || 
|-id=334 bgcolor=#d6d6d6
| 241334 ||  || — || November 9, 2007 || Catalina || CSS || — || align=right | 3.5 km || 
|-id=335 bgcolor=#E9E9E9
| 241335 ||  || — || November 9, 2007 || Kitt Peak || Spacewatch || AGN || align=right | 1.6 km || 
|-id=336 bgcolor=#d6d6d6
| 241336 ||  || — || November 9, 2007 || Kitt Peak || Spacewatch || NAE || align=right | 4.4 km || 
|-id=337 bgcolor=#E9E9E9
| 241337 ||  || — || November 12, 2007 || Catalina || CSS || — || align=right | 3.6 km || 
|-id=338 bgcolor=#E9E9E9
| 241338 ||  || — || November 13, 2007 || Mount Lemmon || Mount Lemmon Survey || — || align=right | 1.2 km || 
|-id=339 bgcolor=#E9E9E9
| 241339 ||  || — || November 14, 2007 || Socorro || LINEAR || — || align=right | 1.2 km || 
|-id=340 bgcolor=#d6d6d6
| 241340 ||  || — || November 12, 2007 || Catalina || CSS || — || align=right | 3.6 km || 
|-id=341 bgcolor=#E9E9E9
| 241341 ||  || — || November 12, 2007 || Catalina || CSS || — || align=right | 2.9 km || 
|-id=342 bgcolor=#d6d6d6
| 241342 ||  || — || November 2, 2007 || Catalina || CSS || — || align=right | 4.2 km || 
|-id=343 bgcolor=#d6d6d6
| 241343 ||  || — || November 11, 2007 || Mount Lemmon || Mount Lemmon Survey || — || align=right | 6.3 km || 
|-id=344 bgcolor=#d6d6d6
| 241344 ||  || — || November 18, 2007 || Socorro || LINEAR || EOS || align=right | 2.6 km || 
|-id=345 bgcolor=#E9E9E9
| 241345 ||  || — || November 18, 2007 || Mount Lemmon || Mount Lemmon Survey || GEF || align=right | 1.6 km || 
|-id=346 bgcolor=#d6d6d6
| 241346 ||  || — || November 18, 2007 || Mount Lemmon || Mount Lemmon Survey || EOS || align=right | 2.3 km || 
|-id=347 bgcolor=#E9E9E9
| 241347 ||  || — || November 18, 2007 || Mount Lemmon || Mount Lemmon Survey || — || align=right | 2.9 km || 
|-id=348 bgcolor=#d6d6d6
| 241348 ||  || — || November 18, 2007 || Mount Lemmon || Mount Lemmon Survey || HYG || align=right | 2.9 km || 
|-id=349 bgcolor=#E9E9E9
| 241349 ||  || — || November 18, 2007 || Mount Lemmon || Mount Lemmon Survey || — || align=right | 3.4 km || 
|-id=350 bgcolor=#fefefe
| 241350 ||  || — || November 18, 2007 || Mount Lemmon || Mount Lemmon Survey || — || align=right | 1.9 km || 
|-id=351 bgcolor=#E9E9E9
| 241351 ||  || — || November 17, 2007 || Catalina || CSS || — || align=right | 2.9 km || 
|-id=352 bgcolor=#fefefe
| 241352 ||  || — || November 20, 2007 || Mount Lemmon || Mount Lemmon Survey || — || align=right | 2.4 km || 
|-id=353 bgcolor=#d6d6d6
| 241353 ||  || — || November 20, 2007 || Mount Lemmon || Mount Lemmon Survey || — || align=right | 4.2 km || 
|-id=354 bgcolor=#d6d6d6
| 241354 ||  || — || November 30, 2007 || Lulin Observatory || T.-C. Yang, Q.-z. Ye || TEL || align=right | 2.2 km || 
|-id=355 bgcolor=#d6d6d6
| 241355 ||  || — || November 18, 2007 || Mount Lemmon || Mount Lemmon Survey || — || align=right | 4.5 km || 
|-id=356 bgcolor=#E9E9E9
| 241356 ||  || — || November 17, 2007 || Kitt Peak || Spacewatch || — || align=right | 2.3 km || 
|-id=357 bgcolor=#d6d6d6
| 241357 ||  || — || November 19, 2007 || Kitt Peak || Spacewatch || — || align=right | 4.2 km || 
|-id=358 bgcolor=#d6d6d6
| 241358 ||  || — || November 18, 2007 || Mount Lemmon || Mount Lemmon Survey || EOS || align=right | 2.8 km || 
|-id=359 bgcolor=#E9E9E9
| 241359 ||  || — || December 3, 2007 || Catalina || CSS || — || align=right | 3.7 km || 
|-id=360 bgcolor=#d6d6d6
| 241360 ||  || — || December 4, 2007 || Mount Lemmon || Mount Lemmon Survey || THM || align=right | 2.2 km || 
|-id=361 bgcolor=#E9E9E9
| 241361 ||  || — || December 8, 2007 || Bisei SG Center || BATTeRS || — || align=right | 4.6 km || 
|-id=362 bgcolor=#d6d6d6
| 241362 ||  || — || December 18, 2007 || Majorca || OAM Obs. || — || align=right | 4.4 km || 
|-id=363 bgcolor=#d6d6d6
| 241363 Érdibálint ||  ||  || December 19, 2007 || Piszkéstető || K. Sárneczky || — || align=right | 9.8 km || 
|-id=364 bgcolor=#d6d6d6
| 241364 Reneangelil ||  ||  || January 7, 2008 || Vicques || M. Ory || — || align=right | 4.5 km || 
|-id=365 bgcolor=#d6d6d6
| 241365 ||  || — || January 9, 2008 || Jarnac || Jarnac Obs. || — || align=right | 5.3 km || 
|-id=366 bgcolor=#E9E9E9
| 241366 ||  || — || January 10, 2008 || Mount Lemmon || Mount Lemmon Survey || — || align=right | 2.5 km || 
|-id=367 bgcolor=#d6d6d6
| 241367 ||  || — || January 11, 2008 || Kitt Peak || Spacewatch || MEL || align=right | 5.0 km || 
|-id=368 bgcolor=#E9E9E9
| 241368 ||  || — || February 24, 2008 || Piszkéstető || K. Sárneczky || — || align=right | 2.7 km || 
|-id=369 bgcolor=#fefefe
| 241369 ||  || — || May 29, 2008 || Mount Lemmon || Mount Lemmon Survey || H || align=right data-sort-value="0.85" | 850 m || 
|-id=370 bgcolor=#FFC2E0
| 241370 ||  || — || June 9, 2008 || Catalina || CSS || APO +1km || align=right data-sort-value="0.76" | 760 m || 
|-id=371 bgcolor=#E9E9E9
| 241371 ||  || — || August 22, 2008 || Kitt Peak || Spacewatch || DOR || align=right | 3.4 km || 
|-id=372 bgcolor=#E9E9E9
| 241372 ||  || — || August 30, 2008 || Socorro || LINEAR || GEF || align=right | 4.5 km || 
|-id=373 bgcolor=#d6d6d6
| 241373 || 2008 RM || — || September 2, 2008 || Kleť || Kleť Obs. || — || align=right | 3.9 km || 
|-id=374 bgcolor=#E9E9E9
| 241374 ||  || — || September 4, 2008 || Kitt Peak || Spacewatch || — || align=right | 2.0 km || 
|-id=375 bgcolor=#fefefe
| 241375 ||  || — || September 7, 2008 || Mount Lemmon || Mount Lemmon Survey || — || align=right | 1.1 km || 
|-id=376 bgcolor=#d6d6d6
| 241376 ||  || — || September 9, 2008 || Mount Lemmon || Mount Lemmon Survey || HIL || align=right | 6.2 km || 
|-id=377 bgcolor=#fefefe
| 241377 ||  || — || September 9, 2008 || Mount Lemmon || Mount Lemmon Survey || — || align=right data-sort-value="0.76" | 760 m || 
|-id=378 bgcolor=#fefefe
| 241378 ||  || — || September 23, 2008 || Mount Lemmon || Mount Lemmon Survey || — || align=right | 1.2 km || 
|-id=379 bgcolor=#fefefe
| 241379 ||  || — || September 23, 2008 || Mount Lemmon || Mount Lemmon Survey || — || align=right | 1.8 km || 
|-id=380 bgcolor=#E9E9E9
| 241380 ||  || — || September 22, 2008 || Mount Lemmon || Mount Lemmon Survey || KON || align=right | 2.6 km || 
|-id=381 bgcolor=#d6d6d6
| 241381 ||  || — || September 24, 2008 || Goodricke-Pigott || R. A. Tucker || — || align=right | 5.4 km || 
|-id=382 bgcolor=#d6d6d6
| 241382 ||  || — || September 24, 2008 || Mount Lemmon || Mount Lemmon Survey || HYG || align=right | 4.1 km || 
|-id=383 bgcolor=#E9E9E9
| 241383 ||  || — || September 23, 2008 || Mount Lemmon || Mount Lemmon Survey || — || align=right | 4.2 km || 
|-id=384 bgcolor=#E9E9E9
| 241384 ||  || — || September 28, 2008 || Socorro || LINEAR || — || align=right | 1.5 km || 
|-id=385 bgcolor=#fefefe
| 241385 ||  || — || September 24, 2008 || Mount Lemmon || Mount Lemmon Survey || FLO || align=right data-sort-value="0.60" | 600 m || 
|-id=386 bgcolor=#E9E9E9
| 241386 ||  || — || September 26, 2008 || Kitt Peak || Spacewatch || — || align=right | 2.2 km || 
|-id=387 bgcolor=#fefefe
| 241387 ||  || — || September 29, 2008 || Kitt Peak || Spacewatch || — || align=right data-sort-value="0.96" | 960 m || 
|-id=388 bgcolor=#E9E9E9
| 241388 ||  || — || September 24, 2008 || Mount Lemmon || Mount Lemmon Survey || JUN || align=right | 1.5 km || 
|-id=389 bgcolor=#fefefe
| 241389 ||  || — || September 29, 2008 || Kitt Peak || Spacewatch || — || align=right data-sort-value="0.85" | 850 m || 
|-id=390 bgcolor=#E9E9E9
| 241390 ||  || — || September 23, 2008 || Catalina || CSS || — || align=right | 1.9 km || 
|-id=391 bgcolor=#fefefe
| 241391 ||  || — || September 21, 2008 || Kitt Peak || Spacewatch || NYS || align=right data-sort-value="0.89" | 890 m || 
|-id=392 bgcolor=#fefefe
| 241392 ||  || — || September 27, 2008 || Mount Lemmon || Mount Lemmon Survey || FLO || align=right data-sort-value="0.75" | 750 m || 
|-id=393 bgcolor=#E9E9E9
| 241393 ||  || — || September 29, 2008 || Catalina || CSS || — || align=right | 3.7 km || 
|-id=394 bgcolor=#E9E9E9
| 241394 ||  || — || September 29, 2008 || Mount Lemmon || Mount Lemmon Survey || — || align=right | 1.8 km || 
|-id=395 bgcolor=#fefefe
| 241395 ||  || — || October 2, 2008 || Kitt Peak || Spacewatch || — || align=right data-sort-value="0.94" | 940 m || 
|-id=396 bgcolor=#fefefe
| 241396 ||  || — || October 2, 2008 || Kitt Peak || Spacewatch || — || align=right | 1.7 km || 
|-id=397 bgcolor=#fefefe
| 241397 ||  || — || October 6, 2008 || Kitt Peak || Spacewatch || H || align=right data-sort-value="0.89" | 890 m || 
|-id=398 bgcolor=#fefefe
| 241398 ||  || — || October 8, 2008 || Mount Lemmon || Mount Lemmon Survey || — || align=right | 2.5 km || 
|-id=399 bgcolor=#fefefe
| 241399 ||  || — || October 8, 2008 || Kitt Peak || Spacewatch || — || align=right data-sort-value="0.93" | 930 m || 
|-id=400 bgcolor=#E9E9E9
| 241400 ||  || — || October 1, 2008 || Kitt Peak || Spacewatch || CLO || align=right | 3.2 km || 
|}

241401–241500 

|-bgcolor=#fefefe
| 241401 ||  || — || October 8, 2008 || Catalina || CSS || — || align=right data-sort-value="0.84" | 840 m || 
|-id=402 bgcolor=#d6d6d6
| 241402 ||  || — || October 6, 2008 || Mount Lemmon || Mount Lemmon Survey || EOS || align=right | 2.7 km || 
|-id=403 bgcolor=#fefefe
| 241403 ||  || — || October 20, 2008 || Kitt Peak || Spacewatch || — || align=right | 1.1 km || 
|-id=404 bgcolor=#E9E9E9
| 241404 ||  || — || October 21, 2008 || Kitt Peak || Spacewatch || — || align=right | 1.5 km || 
|-id=405 bgcolor=#E9E9E9
| 241405 ||  || — || October 21, 2008 || Kitt Peak || Spacewatch || HOF || align=right | 3.1 km || 
|-id=406 bgcolor=#fefefe
| 241406 ||  || — || October 21, 2008 || Kitt Peak || Spacewatch || — || align=right | 1.1 km || 
|-id=407 bgcolor=#fefefe
| 241407 ||  || — || October 21, 2008 || Mount Lemmon || Mount Lemmon Survey || FLO || align=right data-sort-value="0.75" | 750 m || 
|-id=408 bgcolor=#E9E9E9
| 241408 ||  || — || October 26, 2008 || Socorro || LINEAR || — || align=right | 3.0 km || 
|-id=409 bgcolor=#E9E9E9
| 241409 ||  || — || October 30, 2008 || Sandlot || G. Hug || — || align=right | 3.4 km || 
|-id=410 bgcolor=#d6d6d6
| 241410 ||  || — || October 22, 2008 || Kitt Peak || Spacewatch || — || align=right | 3.5 km || 
|-id=411 bgcolor=#E9E9E9
| 241411 ||  || — || October 22, 2008 || Kitt Peak || Spacewatch || HOF || align=right | 4.4 km || 
|-id=412 bgcolor=#d6d6d6
| 241412 ||  || — || October 22, 2008 || Kitt Peak || Spacewatch || — || align=right | 6.0 km || 
|-id=413 bgcolor=#d6d6d6
| 241413 ||  || — || October 23, 2008 || Kitt Peak || Spacewatch || — || align=right | 3.4 km || 
|-id=414 bgcolor=#E9E9E9
| 241414 ||  || — || October 23, 2008 || Kitt Peak || Spacewatch || — || align=right | 1.6 km || 
|-id=415 bgcolor=#fefefe
| 241415 ||  || — || October 24, 2008 || Kitt Peak || Spacewatch || FLO || align=right data-sort-value="0.77" | 770 m || 
|-id=416 bgcolor=#E9E9E9
| 241416 ||  || — || October 26, 2008 || Socorro || LINEAR || — || align=right | 2.0 km || 
|-id=417 bgcolor=#E9E9E9
| 241417 ||  || — || October 27, 2008 || Socorro || LINEAR || — || align=right | 2.6 km || 
|-id=418 bgcolor=#d6d6d6
| 241418 Darmstadt ||  ||  || October 31, 2008 || Tzec Maun || E. Schwab || — || align=right | 4.7 km || 
|-id=419 bgcolor=#E9E9E9
| 241419 ||  || — || October 23, 2008 || Kitt Peak || Spacewatch || — || align=right | 3.3 km || 
|-id=420 bgcolor=#fefefe
| 241420 ||  || — || October 25, 2008 || Kitt Peak || Spacewatch || — || align=right | 1.3 km || 
|-id=421 bgcolor=#E9E9E9
| 241421 ||  || — || October 26, 2008 || Kitt Peak || Spacewatch || — || align=right | 3.7 km || 
|-id=422 bgcolor=#E9E9E9
| 241422 ||  || — || October 26, 2008 || Kitt Peak || Spacewatch || MIT || align=right | 4.7 km || 
|-id=423 bgcolor=#fefefe
| 241423 ||  || — || October 26, 2008 || Kitt Peak || Spacewatch || — || align=right data-sort-value="0.95" | 950 m || 
|-id=424 bgcolor=#E9E9E9
| 241424 ||  || — || October 31, 2008 || Mount Lemmon || Mount Lemmon Survey || — || align=right | 1.6 km || 
|-id=425 bgcolor=#E9E9E9
| 241425 ||  || — || October 31, 2008 || Mount Lemmon || Mount Lemmon Survey || — || align=right | 2.7 km || 
|-id=426 bgcolor=#E9E9E9
| 241426 ||  || — || October 31, 2008 || Kitt Peak || Spacewatch || HNA || align=right | 2.7 km || 
|-id=427 bgcolor=#E9E9E9
| 241427 ||  || — || October 27, 2008 || Kitt Peak || Spacewatch || GEF || align=right | 1.6 km || 
|-id=428 bgcolor=#fefefe
| 241428 ||  || — || November 6, 2008 || Mount Lemmon || Mount Lemmon Survey || — || align=right data-sort-value="0.88" | 880 m || 
|-id=429 bgcolor=#fefefe
| 241429 ||  || — || November 8, 2008 || Kitt Peak || Spacewatch || NYS || align=right data-sort-value="0.76" | 760 m || 
|-id=430 bgcolor=#fefefe
| 241430 ||  || — || November 7, 2008 || Catalina || CSS || — || align=right | 2.0 km || 
|-id=431 bgcolor=#d6d6d6
| 241431 ||  || — || November 20, 2008 || Kitt Peak || Spacewatch || — || align=right | 2.6 km || 
|-id=432 bgcolor=#d6d6d6
| 241432 ||  || — || November 21, 2008 || Mount Lemmon || Mount Lemmon Survey || — || align=right | 3.0 km || 
|-id=433 bgcolor=#E9E9E9
| 241433 ||  || — || November 23, 2008 || Socorro || LINEAR || — || align=right | 2.4 km || 
|-id=434 bgcolor=#fefefe
| 241434 ||  || — || November 30, 2008 || Mount Lemmon || Mount Lemmon Survey || FLO || align=right data-sort-value="0.78" | 780 m || 
|-id=435 bgcolor=#E9E9E9
| 241435 ||  || — || November 30, 2008 || Kitt Peak || Spacewatch || AGN || align=right | 1.7 km || 
|-id=436 bgcolor=#d6d6d6
| 241436 ||  || — || November 30, 2008 || Mount Lemmon || Mount Lemmon Survey || — || align=right | 5.2 km || 
|-id=437 bgcolor=#E9E9E9
| 241437 ||  || — || November 21, 2008 || Kitt Peak || Spacewatch || HOF || align=right | 3.0 km || 
|-id=438 bgcolor=#d6d6d6
| 241438 ||  || — || December 2, 2008 || Mount Lemmon || Mount Lemmon Survey || NAE || align=right | 4.3 km || 
|-id=439 bgcolor=#d6d6d6
| 241439 ||  || — || December 1, 2008 || Kitt Peak || Spacewatch || THM || align=right | 2.6 km || 
|-id=440 bgcolor=#E9E9E9
| 241440 ||  || — || December 6, 2008 || Socorro || LINEAR || — || align=right | 1.5 km || 
|-id=441 bgcolor=#d6d6d6
| 241441 ||  || — || December 3, 2008 || Mount Lemmon || Mount Lemmon Survey || — || align=right | 5.6 km || 
|-id=442 bgcolor=#d6d6d6
| 241442 Shandongkexie ||  ||  || December 25, 2008 || Weihai || Shandong University Obs. || — || align=right | 4.3 km || 
|-id=443 bgcolor=#d6d6d6
| 241443 ||  || — || December 21, 2008 || Kitt Peak || Spacewatch || KOR || align=right | 1.8 km || 
|-id=444 bgcolor=#d6d6d6
| 241444 ||  || — || December 21, 2008 || Mount Lemmon || Mount Lemmon Survey || KOR || align=right | 1.5 km || 
|-id=445 bgcolor=#E9E9E9
| 241445 ||  || — || December 18, 2008 || La Sagra || OAM Obs. || — || align=right | 2.1 km || 
|-id=446 bgcolor=#d6d6d6
| 241446 ||  || — || December 30, 2008 || Mount Lemmon || Mount Lemmon Survey || — || align=right | 3.2 km || 
|-id=447 bgcolor=#E9E9E9
| 241447 ||  || — || December 30, 2008 || Mount Lemmon || Mount Lemmon Survey || — || align=right | 1.4 km || 
|-id=448 bgcolor=#E9E9E9
| 241448 ||  || — || December 29, 2008 || Kitt Peak || Spacewatch || — || align=right data-sort-value="0.87" | 870 m || 
|-id=449 bgcolor=#d6d6d6
| 241449 ||  || — || December 29, 2008 || Mount Lemmon || Mount Lemmon Survey || — || align=right | 5.7 km || 
|-id=450 bgcolor=#E9E9E9
| 241450 ||  || — || December 29, 2008 || Kitt Peak || Spacewatch || AST || align=right | 2.9 km || 
|-id=451 bgcolor=#E9E9E9
| 241451 ||  || — || December 29, 2008 || Kitt Peak || Spacewatch || — || align=right | 1.3 km || 
|-id=452 bgcolor=#E9E9E9
| 241452 ||  || — || December 31, 2008 || Kitt Peak || Spacewatch || — || align=right | 1.4 km || 
|-id=453 bgcolor=#E9E9E9
| 241453 ||  || — || December 31, 2008 || Kitt Peak || Spacewatch || — || align=right | 2.9 km || 
|-id=454 bgcolor=#E9E9E9
| 241454 ||  || — || December 31, 2008 || Kitt Peak || Spacewatch || — || align=right | 1.1 km || 
|-id=455 bgcolor=#E9E9E9
| 241455 ||  || — || December 29, 2008 || Kitt Peak || Spacewatch || ADE || align=right | 3.0 km || 
|-id=456 bgcolor=#E9E9E9
| 241456 ||  || — || December 29, 2008 || Kitt Peak || Spacewatch || — || align=right | 2.9 km || 
|-id=457 bgcolor=#E9E9E9
| 241457 ||  || — || December 30, 2008 || Mount Lemmon || Mount Lemmon Survey || — || align=right | 2.6 km || 
|-id=458 bgcolor=#E9E9E9
| 241458 ||  || — || December 30, 2008 || Kitt Peak || Spacewatch || — || align=right | 3.9 km || 
|-id=459 bgcolor=#d6d6d6
| 241459 ||  || — || December 22, 2008 || Kitt Peak || Spacewatch || HYG || align=right | 3.2 km || 
|-id=460 bgcolor=#E9E9E9
| 241460 ||  || — || December 22, 2008 || Kitt Peak || Spacewatch || — || align=right | 1.2 km || 
|-id=461 bgcolor=#E9E9E9
| 241461 ||  || — || December 22, 2008 || Mount Lemmon || Mount Lemmon Survey || — || align=right | 2.4 km || 
|-id=462 bgcolor=#E9E9E9
| 241462 ||  || — || December 30, 2008 || Kitt Peak || Spacewatch || HOF || align=right | 3.1 km || 
|-id=463 bgcolor=#E9E9E9
| 241463 ||  || — || December 30, 2008 || Mount Lemmon || Mount Lemmon Survey || — || align=right | 1.5 km || 
|-id=464 bgcolor=#E9E9E9
| 241464 ||  || — || December 30, 2008 || Mount Lemmon || Mount Lemmon Survey || — || align=right | 2.4 km || 
|-id=465 bgcolor=#d6d6d6
| 241465 ||  || — || December 30, 2008 || Mount Lemmon || Mount Lemmon Survey || THM || align=right | 2.8 km || 
|-id=466 bgcolor=#fefefe
| 241466 ||  || — || January 1, 2009 || Kitt Peak || Spacewatch || — || align=right | 1.1 km || 
|-id=467 bgcolor=#d6d6d6
| 241467 ||  || — || January 2, 2009 || Mount Lemmon || Mount Lemmon Survey || — || align=right | 3.8 km || 
|-id=468 bgcolor=#fefefe
| 241468 ||  || — || January 3, 2009 || Kitt Peak || Spacewatch || — || align=right | 1.1 km || 
|-id=469 bgcolor=#E9E9E9
| 241469 ||  || — || January 3, 2009 || Kitt Peak || Spacewatch || — || align=right | 1.4 km || 
|-id=470 bgcolor=#fefefe
| 241470 ||  || — || January 8, 2009 || Kitt Peak || Spacewatch || V || align=right data-sort-value="0.92" | 920 m || 
|-id=471 bgcolor=#fefefe
| 241471 ||  || — || January 15, 2009 || Kitt Peak || Spacewatch || FLO || align=right | 1.0 km || 
|-id=472 bgcolor=#d6d6d6
| 241472 ||  || — || January 15, 2009 || Socorro || LINEAR || EOS || align=right | 3.3 km || 
|-id=473 bgcolor=#E9E9E9
| 241473 ||  || — || January 19, 2009 || Socorro || LINEAR || — || align=right | 4.1 km || 
|-id=474 bgcolor=#E9E9E9
| 241474 ||  || — || January 21, 2009 || Socorro || LINEAR || MAR || align=right | 1.8 km || 
|-id=475 bgcolor=#d6d6d6
| 241475 Martinagedeck ||  ||  || January 25, 2009 || Calar Alto || F. Hormuth || — || align=right | 3.4 km || 
|-id=476 bgcolor=#E9E9E9
| 241476 ||  || — || January 16, 2009 || Kitt Peak || Spacewatch || — || align=right | 1.5 km || 
|-id=477 bgcolor=#d6d6d6
| 241477 ||  || — || January 16, 2009 || Kitt Peak || Spacewatch || HYG || align=right | 3.9 km || 
|-id=478 bgcolor=#d6d6d6
| 241478 ||  || — || January 20, 2009 || Kitt Peak || Spacewatch || EOS || align=right | 2.3 km || 
|-id=479 bgcolor=#d6d6d6
| 241479 ||  || — || January 20, 2009 || Kitt Peak || Spacewatch || — || align=right | 3.1 km || 
|-id=480 bgcolor=#d6d6d6
| 241480 ||  || — || January 20, 2009 || Catalina || CSS || EOS || align=right | 2.5 km || 
|-id=481 bgcolor=#d6d6d6
| 241481 ||  || — || January 31, 2009 || Uccle || T. Pauwels, E. W. Elst || EOS || align=right | 5.9 km || 
|-id=482 bgcolor=#d6d6d6
| 241482 ||  || — || January 25, 2009 || Kitt Peak || Spacewatch || — || align=right | 3.4 km || 
|-id=483 bgcolor=#E9E9E9
| 241483 ||  || — || January 25, 2009 || Kitt Peak || Spacewatch || HOF || align=right | 3.6 km || 
|-id=484 bgcolor=#d6d6d6
| 241484 ||  || — || January 25, 2009 || Kitt Peak || Spacewatch || — || align=right | 3.3 km || 
|-id=485 bgcolor=#E9E9E9
| 241485 ||  || — || January 26, 2009 || Catalina || CSS || AER || align=right | 2.2 km || 
|-id=486 bgcolor=#E9E9E9
| 241486 ||  || — || January 26, 2009 || Mount Lemmon || Mount Lemmon Survey || — || align=right | 1.6 km || 
|-id=487 bgcolor=#d6d6d6
| 241487 ||  || — || January 28, 2009 || Catalina || CSS || — || align=right | 3.6 km || 
|-id=488 bgcolor=#E9E9E9
| 241488 ||  || — || January 30, 2009 || Mount Lemmon || Mount Lemmon Survey || — || align=right | 1.7 km || 
|-id=489 bgcolor=#d6d6d6
| 241489 ||  || — || January 29, 2009 || Kitt Peak || Spacewatch || — || align=right | 3.1 km || 
|-id=490 bgcolor=#E9E9E9
| 241490 ||  || — || January 29, 2009 || Kitt Peak || Spacewatch || MRX || align=right | 1.5 km || 
|-id=491 bgcolor=#d6d6d6
| 241491 ||  || — || January 30, 2009 || Kitt Peak || Spacewatch || KOR || align=right | 1.6 km || 
|-id=492 bgcolor=#d6d6d6
| 241492 ||  || — || January 17, 2009 || Kitt Peak || Spacewatch || TEL || align=right | 1.8 km || 
|-id=493 bgcolor=#d6d6d6
| 241493 ||  || — || January 18, 2009 || Mount Lemmon || Mount Lemmon Survey || KOR || align=right | 2.0 km || 
|-id=494 bgcolor=#d6d6d6
| 241494 ||  || — || January 25, 2009 || Kitt Peak || Spacewatch || — || align=right | 3.2 km || 
|-id=495 bgcolor=#d6d6d6
| 241495 ||  || — || January 20, 2009 || Catalina || CSS || — || align=right | 4.3 km || 
|-id=496 bgcolor=#E9E9E9
| 241496 ||  || — || February 2, 2009 || Moletai || K. Černis, J. Zdanavičius || — || align=right | 2.1 km || 
|-id=497 bgcolor=#d6d6d6
| 241497 ||  || — || February 7, 2009 || Great Shefford || P. Birtwhistle || — || align=right | 3.7 km || 
|-id=498 bgcolor=#E9E9E9
| 241498 ||  || — || February 1, 2009 || Kitt Peak || Spacewatch || — || align=right | 2.8 km || 
|-id=499 bgcolor=#d6d6d6
| 241499 ||  || — || February 1, 2009 || Kitt Peak || Spacewatch || EOS || align=right | 2.5 km || 
|-id=500 bgcolor=#fefefe
| 241500 ||  || — || February 1, 2009 || Kitt Peak || Spacewatch || MAS || align=right | 1.0 km || 
|}

241501–241600 

|-bgcolor=#d6d6d6
| 241501 ||  || — || February 1, 2009 || Kitt Peak || Spacewatch || — || align=right | 5.4 km || 
|-id=502 bgcolor=#d6d6d6
| 241502 ||  || — || February 13, 2009 || Kitt Peak || Spacewatch || KAR || align=right | 1.5 km || 
|-id=503 bgcolor=#d6d6d6
| 241503 ||  || — || February 13, 2009 || Mount Lemmon || Mount Lemmon Survey || — || align=right | 4.7 km || 
|-id=504 bgcolor=#d6d6d6
| 241504 ||  || — || February 14, 2009 || Kitt Peak || Spacewatch || SYL7:4 || align=right | 6.6 km || 
|-id=505 bgcolor=#d6d6d6
| 241505 ||  || — || February 14, 2009 || Mount Lemmon || Mount Lemmon Survey || HYG || align=right | 2.9 km || 
|-id=506 bgcolor=#d6d6d6
| 241506 ||  || — || February 3, 2009 || Siding Spring || SSS || EUP || align=right | 5.5 km || 
|-id=507 bgcolor=#d6d6d6
| 241507 ||  || — || February 3, 2009 || Kitt Peak || Spacewatch || — || align=right | 3.9 km || 
|-id=508 bgcolor=#d6d6d6
| 241508 ||  || — || February 17, 2009 || La Sagra || OAM Obs. || KOR || align=right | 1.8 km || 
|-id=509 bgcolor=#d6d6d6
| 241509 Sessler ||  ||  || February 22, 2009 || Calar Alto || F. Hormuth || — || align=right | 2.8 km || 
|-id=510 bgcolor=#d6d6d6
| 241510 ||  || — || February 19, 2009 || Dauban || F. Kugel || — || align=right | 3.6 km || 
|-id=511 bgcolor=#d6d6d6
| 241511 ||  || — || February 18, 2009 || La Sagra || OAM Obs. || — || align=right | 5.1 km || 
|-id=512 bgcolor=#d6d6d6
| 241512 ||  || — || February 25, 2009 || Dauban || F. Kugel || — || align=right | 4.1 km || 
|-id=513 bgcolor=#d6d6d6
| 241513 ||  || — || February 28, 2009 || Calvin-Rehoboth || Calvin–Rehoboth Obs. || — || align=right | 4.0 km || 
|-id=514 bgcolor=#d6d6d6
| 241514 ||  || — || February 26, 2009 || Catalina || CSS || NAE || align=right | 4.9 km || 
|-id=515 bgcolor=#E9E9E9
| 241515 ||  || — || February 26, 2009 || Mount Lemmon || Mount Lemmon Survey || WIT || align=right | 1.3 km || 
|-id=516 bgcolor=#d6d6d6
| 241516 ||  || — || February 19, 2009 || Socorro || LINEAR || — || align=right | 4.4 km || 
|-id=517 bgcolor=#d6d6d6
| 241517 || 2009 EK || — || March 1, 2009 || Great Shefford || P. Birtwhistle || — || align=right | 5.3 km || 
|-id=518 bgcolor=#d6d6d6
| 241518 ||  || — || March 3, 2009 || Catalina || CSS || — || align=right | 5.2 km || 
|-id=519 bgcolor=#d6d6d6
| 241519 ||  || — || March 16, 2009 || Mount Lemmon || Mount Lemmon Survey || — || align=right | 4.2 km || 
|-id=520 bgcolor=#d6d6d6
| 241520 ||  || — || March 29, 2009 || Jornada || D. S. Dixon || URS || align=right | 5.1 km || 
|-id=521 bgcolor=#d6d6d6
| 241521 ||  || — || April 17, 2009 || Kitt Peak || Spacewatch || — || align=right | 5.2 km || 
|-id=522 bgcolor=#fefefe
| 241522 ||  || — || April 17, 2009 || Kitt Peak || Spacewatch || — || align=right | 1.4 km || 
|-id=523 bgcolor=#E9E9E9
| 241523 ||  || — || April 18, 2009 || Mount Lemmon || Mount Lemmon Survey || — || align=right | 3.2 km || 
|-id=524 bgcolor=#d6d6d6
| 241524 ||  || — || April 17, 2009 || Kitt Peak || Spacewatch || — || align=right | 3.7 km || 
|-id=525 bgcolor=#fefefe
| 241525 ||  || — || September 11, 2009 || Catalina || CSS || FLO || align=right data-sort-value="0.66" | 660 m || 
|-id=526 bgcolor=#d6d6d6
| 241526 ||  || — || December 15, 2009 || Mount Lemmon || Mount Lemmon Survey || HYG || align=right | 3.6 km || 
|-id=527 bgcolor=#E9E9E9
| 241527 Edwardwright ||  ||  || February 8, 2010 || WISE || WISE || — || align=right | 2.9 km || 
|-id=528 bgcolor=#d6d6d6
| 241528 Tubman ||  ||  || February 8, 2010 || WISE || WISE || SHU3:2 || align=right | 7.6 km || 
|-id=529 bgcolor=#d6d6d6
| 241529 Roccutri ||  ||  || February 10, 2010 || WISE || WISE || — || align=right | 4.5 km || 
|-id=530 bgcolor=#E9E9E9
| 241530 ||  || — || February 13, 2010 || Mount Lemmon || Mount Lemmon Survey || HEN || align=right | 1.3 km || 
|-id=531 bgcolor=#E9E9E9
| 241531 ||  || — || February 10, 2010 || Kitt Peak || Spacewatch || — || align=right | 3.2 km || 
|-id=532 bgcolor=#fefefe
| 241532 ||  || — || February 16, 2010 || Kitt Peak || Spacewatch || — || align=right data-sort-value="0.91" | 910 m || 
|-id=533 bgcolor=#E9E9E9
| 241533 ||  || — || February 21, 2010 || Bisei SG Center || BATTeRS || PAD || align=right | 3.7 km || 
|-id=534 bgcolor=#d6d6d6
| 241534 ||  || — || March 11, 2010 || La Sagra || OAM Obs. || — || align=right | 5.3 km || 
|-id=535 bgcolor=#fefefe
| 241535 ||  || — || March 12, 2010 || Mount Lemmon || Mount Lemmon Survey || FLO || align=right data-sort-value="0.76" | 760 m || 
|-id=536 bgcolor=#d6d6d6
| 241536 ||  || — || March 11, 2010 || La Sagra || OAM Obs. || EUP || align=right | 5.1 km || 
|-id=537 bgcolor=#E9E9E9
| 241537 ||  || — || March 12, 2010 || Mount Lemmon || Mount Lemmon Survey || — || align=right | 1.1 km || 
|-id=538 bgcolor=#E9E9E9
| 241538 Chudniv ||  ||  || March 10, 2010 || Andrushivka || Andrushivka Obs. || — || align=right | 3.8 km || 
|-id=539 bgcolor=#E9E9E9
| 241539 ||  || — || March 12, 2010 || Kitt Peak || Spacewatch || KON || align=right | 2.4 km || 
|-id=540 bgcolor=#fefefe
| 241540 ||  || — || March 14, 2010 || La Sagra || OAM Obs. || PHO || align=right data-sort-value="0.98" | 980 m || 
|-id=541 bgcolor=#d6d6d6
| 241541 ||  || — || March 15, 2010 || Kitt Peak || Spacewatch || THM || align=right | 2.9 km || 
|-id=542 bgcolor=#d6d6d6
| 241542 ||  || — || March 15, 2010 || Kitt Peak || Spacewatch || — || align=right | 3.9 km || 
|-id=543 bgcolor=#E9E9E9
| 241543 ||  || — || March 15, 2010 || Mount Lemmon || Mount Lemmon Survey || — || align=right | 1.8 km || 
|-id=544 bgcolor=#d6d6d6
| 241544 ||  || — || March 12, 2010 || Kitt Peak || Spacewatch || — || align=right | 2.9 km || 
|-id=545 bgcolor=#E9E9E9
| 241545 ||  || — || March 12, 2010 || Kitt Peak || Spacewatch || — || align=right | 2.9 km || 
|-id=546 bgcolor=#d6d6d6
| 241546 ||  || — || March 13, 2010 || Kitt Peak || Spacewatch || HYG || align=right | 3.3 km || 
|-id=547 bgcolor=#d6d6d6
| 241547 ||  || — || March 16, 2010 || Kitt Peak || Spacewatch || — || align=right | 3.1 km || 
|-id=548 bgcolor=#d6d6d6
| 241548 ||  || — || March 17, 2010 || Kitt Peak || Spacewatch || — || align=right | 3.1 km || 
|-id=549 bgcolor=#fefefe
| 241549 ||  || — || March 16, 2010 || Kitt Peak || Spacewatch || — || align=right data-sort-value="0.93" | 930 m || 
|-id=550 bgcolor=#fefefe
| 241550 ||  || — || March 16, 2010 || Mount Lemmon || Mount Lemmon Survey || — || align=right data-sort-value="0.88" | 880 m || 
|-id=551 bgcolor=#fefefe
| 241551 ||  || — || March 19, 2010 || Mount Lemmon || Mount Lemmon Survey || — || align=right | 1.4 km || 
|-id=552 bgcolor=#fefefe
| 241552 ||  || — || March 19, 2010 || Mount Lemmon || Mount Lemmon Survey || — || align=right | 7.0 km || 
|-id=553 bgcolor=#fefefe
| 241553 ||  || — || March 18, 2010 || Kitt Peak || Spacewatch || FLO || align=right data-sort-value="0.78" | 780 m || 
|-id=554 bgcolor=#d6d6d6
| 241554 ||  || — || March 23, 2010 || ESA OGS || ESA OGS || — || align=right | 4.6 km || 
|-id=555 bgcolor=#d6d6d6
| 241555 ||  || — || April 3, 2010 || Mayhill || iTelescope Obs. || CHA || align=right | 2.9 km || 
|-id=556 bgcolor=#E9E9E9
| 241556 ||  || — || April 8, 2010 || La Sagra || OAM Obs. || — || align=right | 3.0 km || 
|-id=557 bgcolor=#fefefe
| 241557 ||  || — || April 5, 2010 || Kitt Peak || Spacewatch || FLO || align=right data-sort-value="0.60" | 600 m || 
|-id=558 bgcolor=#d6d6d6
| 241558 ||  || — || April 9, 2010 || Zvezdno Obshtestvo || F. Fratev || EOS || align=right | 2.5 km || 
|-id=559 bgcolor=#fefefe
| 241559 ||  || — || April 6, 2010 || Catalina || CSS || — || align=right | 1.2 km || 
|-id=560 bgcolor=#d6d6d6
| 241560 || 5002 T-2 || — || September 25, 1973 || Palomar || PLS || — || align=right | 4.6 km || 
|-id=561 bgcolor=#E9E9E9
| 241561 || 2397 T-3 || — || October 16, 1977 || Palomar || PLS || — || align=right | 2.6 km || 
|-id=562 bgcolor=#E9E9E9
| 241562 || 4192 T-3 || — || October 16, 1977 || Palomar || PLS || — || align=right | 2.3 km || 
|-id=563 bgcolor=#d6d6d6
| 241563 ||  || — || March 7, 1981 || Siding Spring || S. J. Bus || HIL3:2 || align=right | 6.8 km || 
|-id=564 bgcolor=#E9E9E9
| 241564 ||  || — || March 7, 1981 || Siding Spring || S. J. Bus || — || align=right | 3.1 km || 
|-id=565 bgcolor=#E9E9E9
| 241565 ||  || — || March 1, 1981 || Siding Spring || S. J. Bus || — || align=right | 4.1 km || 
|-id=566 bgcolor=#E9E9E9
| 241566 ||  || — || March 17, 1993 || La Silla || UESAC || — || align=right | 2.9 km || 
|-id=567 bgcolor=#E9E9E9
| 241567 ||  || — || July 20, 1993 || La Silla || E. W. Elst || — || align=right | 2.4 km || 
|-id=568 bgcolor=#d6d6d6
| 241568 ||  || — || September 15, 1993 || La Silla || E. W. Elst || HYG || align=right | 4.2 km || 
|-id=569 bgcolor=#E9E9E9
| 241569 ||  || — || February 1, 1995 || Kitt Peak || Spacewatch || — || align=right | 1.7 km || 
|-id=570 bgcolor=#d6d6d6
| 241570 ||  || — || March 26, 1995 || Kitt Peak || Spacewatch || — || align=right | 4.8 km || 
|-id=571 bgcolor=#d6d6d6
| 241571 ||  || — || June 24, 1995 || Kitt Peak || Spacewatch || — || align=right | 3.1 km || 
|-id=572 bgcolor=#d6d6d6
| 241572 ||  || — || July 22, 1995 || Kitt Peak || Spacewatch || — || align=right | 4.1 km || 
|-id=573 bgcolor=#C2FFFF
| 241573 ||  || — || August 28, 1995 || Kitt Peak || Spacewatch || L4ARK || align=right | 14 km || 
|-id=574 bgcolor=#E9E9E9
| 241574 ||  || — || September 18, 1995 || Kitt Peak || Spacewatch || — || align=right | 1.9 km || 
|-id=575 bgcolor=#d6d6d6
| 241575 ||  || — || September 19, 1995 || Kitt Peak || Spacewatch || TRE || align=right | 4.1 km || 
|-id=576 bgcolor=#C2FFFF
| 241576 ||  || — || September 20, 1995 || Kitt Peak || Spacewatch || L4 || align=right | 12 km || 
|-id=577 bgcolor=#d6d6d6
| 241577 ||  || — || September 21, 1995 || Kitt Peak || Spacewatch || URS || align=right | 4.6 km || 
|-id=578 bgcolor=#d6d6d6
| 241578 ||  || — || September 26, 1995 || Kitt Peak || Spacewatch || — || align=right | 5.3 km || 
|-id=579 bgcolor=#E9E9E9
| 241579 ||  || — || October 23, 1995 || Kitt Peak || Spacewatch || — || align=right | 1.2 km || 
|-id=580 bgcolor=#fefefe
| 241580 ||  || — || December 19, 1995 || Kitt Peak || Spacewatch || H || align=right data-sort-value="0.89" | 890 m || 
|-id=581 bgcolor=#C2FFFF
| 241581 ||  || — || September 8, 1996 || Kitt Peak || Spacewatch || L4 || align=right | 12 km || 
|-id=582 bgcolor=#C2FFFF
| 241582 ||  || — || September 13, 1996 || La Silla || UDTS || L4 || align=right | 13 km || 
|-id=583 bgcolor=#fefefe
| 241583 ||  || — || October 31, 1996 || Stroncone || A. Vagnozzi || — || align=right data-sort-value="0.96" | 960 m || 
|-id=584 bgcolor=#E9E9E9
| 241584 ||  || — || February 7, 1997 || Kitt Peak || Spacewatch || KON || align=right | 4.2 km || 
|-id=585 bgcolor=#d6d6d6
| 241585 ||  || — || May 2, 1997 || Mauna Kea || C. Veillet || — || align=right | 4.4 km || 
|-id=586 bgcolor=#E9E9E9
| 241586 ||  || — || June 2, 1997 || Kitt Peak || Spacewatch || — || align=right | 2.0 km || 
|-id=587 bgcolor=#E9E9E9
| 241587 ||  || — || July 3, 1997 || Kitt Peak || Spacewatch || — || align=right | 3.7 km || 
|-id=588 bgcolor=#fefefe
| 241588 ||  || — || September 1, 1997 || Prescott || P. G. Comba || — || align=right data-sort-value="0.87" | 870 m || 
|-id=589 bgcolor=#C2FFFF
| 241589 ||  || — || September 28, 1997 || Kitt Peak || Spacewatch || L4 || align=right | 11 km || 
|-id=590 bgcolor=#d6d6d6
| 241590 ||  || — || January 23, 1998 || Modra || A. Galád || — || align=right | 5.0 km || 
|-id=591 bgcolor=#E9E9E9
| 241591 ||  || — || March 20, 1998 || Socorro || LINEAR || — || align=right | 3.5 km || 
|-id=592 bgcolor=#E9E9E9
| 241592 || 1998 KV || — || May 21, 1998 || Kuma Kogen || A. Nakamura || PAE || align=right | 4.5 km || 
|-id=593 bgcolor=#d6d6d6
| 241593 ||  || — || May 28, 1998 || Kitt Peak || Spacewatch || — || align=right | 6.4 km || 
|-id=594 bgcolor=#d6d6d6
| 241594 || 1998 TY || — || October 12, 1998 || Kitt Peak || Spacewatch || — || align=right | 5.4 km || 
|-id=595 bgcolor=#d6d6d6
| 241595 ||  || — || November 21, 1998 || Kitt Peak || Spacewatch || THM || align=right | 2.6 km || 
|-id=596 bgcolor=#FFC2E0
| 241596 ||  || — || December 9, 1998 || Socorro || LINEAR || AMO +1km || align=right | 1.5 km || 
|-id=597 bgcolor=#d6d6d6
| 241597 ||  || — || December 22, 1998 || Kitt Peak || Spacewatch || — || align=right | 2.5 km || 
|-id=598 bgcolor=#d6d6d6
| 241598 ||  || — || April 7, 1999 || Socorro || LINEAR || — || align=right | 2.5 km || 
|-id=599 bgcolor=#E9E9E9
| 241599 ||  || — || May 12, 1999 || Socorro || LINEAR || — || align=right | 3.5 km || 
|-id=600 bgcolor=#fefefe
| 241600 ||  || — || May 10, 1999 || Socorro || LINEAR || — || align=right | 1.4 km || 
|}

241601–241700 

|-bgcolor=#fefefe
| 241601 ||  || — || July 14, 1999 || Socorro || LINEAR || H || align=right | 1.4 km || 
|-id=602 bgcolor=#fefefe
| 241602 ||  || — || September 7, 1999 || Socorro || LINEAR || — || align=right | 1.8 km || 
|-id=603 bgcolor=#E9E9E9
| 241603 ||  || — || September 8, 1999 || Socorro || LINEAR || ADE || align=right | 4.1 km || 
|-id=604 bgcolor=#d6d6d6
| 241604 ||  || — || September 9, 1999 || Socorro || LINEAR || — || align=right | 2.5 km || 
|-id=605 bgcolor=#fefefe
| 241605 ||  || — || September 9, 1999 || Socorro || LINEAR || V || align=right | 1.2 km || 
|-id=606 bgcolor=#d6d6d6
| 241606 ||  || — || September 8, 1999 || Socorro || LINEAR || — || align=right | 5.2 km || 
|-id=607 bgcolor=#E9E9E9
| 241607 ||  || — || September 8, 1999 || Socorro || LINEAR || ADE || align=right | 3.9 km || 
|-id=608 bgcolor=#d6d6d6
| 241608 ||  || — || September 7, 1999 || Catalina || CSS || — || align=right | 2.8 km || 
|-id=609 bgcolor=#d6d6d6
| 241609 ||  || — || September 8, 1999 || Catalina || CSS || Tj (2.94) || align=right | 5.0 km || 
|-id=610 bgcolor=#fefefe
| 241610 ||  || — || September 29, 1999 || Catalina || CSS || — || align=right | 2.2 km || 
|-id=611 bgcolor=#E9E9E9
| 241611 ||  || — || October 8, 1999 || San Marcello || A. Boattini, L. Tesi || — || align=right | 1.4 km || 
|-id=612 bgcolor=#fefefe
| 241612 ||  || — || October 4, 1999 || Socorro || LINEAR || — || align=right | 3.2 km || 
|-id=613 bgcolor=#E9E9E9
| 241613 ||  || — || October 6, 1999 || Socorro || LINEAR || — || align=right | 2.5 km || 
|-id=614 bgcolor=#fefefe
| 241614 ||  || — || October 7, 1999 || Socorro || LINEAR || — || align=right | 1.1 km || 
|-id=615 bgcolor=#E9E9E9
| 241615 ||  || — || October 4, 1999 || Kitt Peak || Spacewatch || — || align=right | 1.1 km || 
|-id=616 bgcolor=#d6d6d6
| 241616 ||  || — || October 4, 1999 || Socorro || LINEAR || — || align=right | 5.9 km || 
|-id=617 bgcolor=#E9E9E9
| 241617 ||  || — || October 3, 1999 || Socorro || LINEAR || EUN || align=right | 5.3 km || 
|-id=618 bgcolor=#d6d6d6
| 241618 ||  || — || October 3, 1999 || Socorro || LINEAR || LIX || align=right | 5.3 km || 
|-id=619 bgcolor=#fefefe
| 241619 ||  || — || October 31, 1999 || Socorro || LINEAR || — || align=right | 1.5 km || 
|-id=620 bgcolor=#d6d6d6
| 241620 ||  || — || October 30, 1999 || Catalina || CSS || — || align=right | 5.1 km || 
|-id=621 bgcolor=#fefefe
| 241621 ||  || — || October 31, 1999 || Catalina || CSS || — || align=right | 2.1 km || 
|-id=622 bgcolor=#fefefe
| 241622 ||  || — || November 6, 1999 || Fountain Hills || C. W. Juels || — || align=right | 3.6 km || 
|-id=623 bgcolor=#d6d6d6
| 241623 ||  || — || November 11, 1999 || EverStaR || Everstar Obs. || — || align=right | 3.9 km || 
|-id=624 bgcolor=#E9E9E9
| 241624 ||  || — || November 3, 1999 || Socorro || LINEAR || — || align=right | 5.9 km || 
|-id=625 bgcolor=#fefefe
| 241625 ||  || — || November 4, 1999 || Socorro || LINEAR || — || align=right | 2.6 km || 
|-id=626 bgcolor=#E9E9E9
| 241626 ||  || — || November 9, 1999 || Kitt Peak || Spacewatch || — || align=right | 2.1 km || 
|-id=627 bgcolor=#fefefe
| 241627 ||  || — || November 14, 1999 || Socorro || LINEAR || — || align=right | 1.7 km || 
|-id=628 bgcolor=#E9E9E9
| 241628 ||  || — || November 14, 1999 || Socorro || LINEAR || — || align=right | 2.5 km || 
|-id=629 bgcolor=#fefefe
| 241629 ||  || — || November 15, 1999 || Socorro || LINEAR || CHL || align=right | 2.8 km || 
|-id=630 bgcolor=#d6d6d6
| 241630 ||  || — || November 4, 1999 || Kitt Peak || Spacewatch || THM || align=right | 2.7 km || 
|-id=631 bgcolor=#fefefe
| 241631 ||  || — || November 9, 1999 || Socorro || LINEAR || NYS || align=right | 1.3 km || 
|-id=632 bgcolor=#E9E9E9
| 241632 ||  || — || November 15, 1999 || Socorro || LINEAR || — || align=right | 1.8 km || 
|-id=633 bgcolor=#E9E9E9
| 241633 ||  || — || November 5, 1999 || Kitt Peak || Spacewatch || — || align=right | 2.9 km || 
|-id=634 bgcolor=#d6d6d6
| 241634 ||  || — || November 30, 1999 || Kitt Peak || Spacewatch || — || align=right | 5.2 km || 
|-id=635 bgcolor=#d6d6d6
| 241635 ||  || — || December 2, 1999 || Kitt Peak || Spacewatch || — || align=right | 5.4 km || 
|-id=636 bgcolor=#E9E9E9
| 241636 ||  || — || December 7, 1999 || Socorro || LINEAR || — || align=right | 1.7 km || 
|-id=637 bgcolor=#d6d6d6
| 241637 ||  || — || December 11, 1999 || Socorro || LINEAR || — || align=right | 2.8 km || 
|-id=638 bgcolor=#E9E9E9
| 241638 ||  || — || December 7, 1999 || Socorro || LINEAR || — || align=right | 5.5 km || 
|-id=639 bgcolor=#fefefe
| 241639 ||  || — || December 13, 1999 || Kitt Peak || Spacewatch || — || align=right | 2.1 km || 
|-id=640 bgcolor=#E9E9E9
| 241640 ||  || — || December 6, 1999 || Socorro || LINEAR || — || align=right | 3.8 km || 
|-id=641 bgcolor=#d6d6d6
| 241641 ||  || — || December 5, 1999 || Kitt Peak || Spacewatch || — || align=right | 5.4 km || 
|-id=642 bgcolor=#E9E9E9
| 241642 ||  || — || January 6, 2000 || Socorro || LINEAR || — || align=right | 3.4 km || 
|-id=643 bgcolor=#C2FFFF
| 241643 ||  || — || January 3, 2000 || Kitt Peak || Spacewatch || L4 || align=right | 16 km || 
|-id=644 bgcolor=#E9E9E9
| 241644 ||  || — || January 4, 2000 || Kitt Peak || Spacewatch || — || align=right | 3.0 km || 
|-id=645 bgcolor=#E9E9E9
| 241645 ||  || — || February 25, 2000 || Catalina || CSS || ADE || align=right | 3.6 km || 
|-id=646 bgcolor=#d6d6d6
| 241646 ||  || — || February 29, 2000 || Socorro || LINEAR || — || align=right | 2.6 km || 
|-id=647 bgcolor=#fefefe
| 241647 ||  || — || March 2, 2000 || Prescott || P. G. Comba || NYS || align=right | 1.7 km || 
|-id=648 bgcolor=#d6d6d6
| 241648 ||  || — || March 4, 2000 || Socorro || LINEAR || EUP || align=right | 9.3 km || 
|-id=649 bgcolor=#FA8072
| 241649 ||  || — || March 9, 2000 || Socorro || LINEAR || — || align=right | 1.3 km || 
|-id=650 bgcolor=#fefefe
| 241650 ||  || — || April 5, 2000 || Socorro || LINEAR || H || align=right data-sort-value="0.98" | 980 m || 
|-id=651 bgcolor=#fefefe
| 241651 ||  || — || April 6, 2000 || Anderson Mesa || LONEOS || — || align=right | 2.1 km || 
|-id=652 bgcolor=#E9E9E9
| 241652 ||  || — || April 2, 2000 || Kitt Peak || Spacewatch || GEF || align=right | 1.5 km || 
|-id=653 bgcolor=#E9E9E9
| 241653 ||  || — || April 24, 2000 || Kitt Peak || Spacewatch || — || align=right | 1.6 km || 
|-id=654 bgcolor=#fefefe
| 241654 ||  || — || April 29, 2000 || Socorro || LINEAR || — || align=right | 1.1 km || 
|-id=655 bgcolor=#E9E9E9
| 241655 ||  || — || April 26, 2000 || Anderson Mesa || LONEOS || — || align=right | 3.4 km || 
|-id=656 bgcolor=#fefefe
| 241656 ||  || — || May 3, 2000 || Socorro || LINEAR || — || align=right | 1.5 km || 
|-id=657 bgcolor=#d6d6d6
| 241657 ||  || — || May 6, 2000 || Ondřejov || P. Pravec, P. Kušnirák || — || align=right | 3.7 km || 
|-id=658 bgcolor=#fefefe
| 241658 ||  || — || May 9, 2000 || Socorro || LINEAR || — || align=right | 1.8 km || 
|-id=659 bgcolor=#fefefe
| 241659 ||  || — || May 5, 2000 || Socorro || LINEAR || — || align=right | 3.5 km || 
|-id=660 bgcolor=#d6d6d6
| 241660 ||  || — || May 7, 2000 || Socorro || LINEAR || — || align=right | 3.2 km || 
|-id=661 bgcolor=#FA8072
| 241661 ||  || — || May 1, 2000 || Anderson Mesa || LONEOS || — || align=right data-sort-value="0.87" | 870 m || 
|-id=662 bgcolor=#FFC2E0
| 241662 ||  || — || May 30, 2000 || Socorro || LINEAR || AMO +1km || align=right data-sort-value="0.9" | 900 m || 
|-id=663 bgcolor=#d6d6d6
| 241663 ||  || — || June 4, 2000 || Socorro || LINEAR || — || align=right | 5.4 km || 
|-id=664 bgcolor=#E9E9E9
| 241664 ||  || — || July 23, 2000 || Socorro || LINEAR || — || align=right | 2.7 km || 
|-id=665 bgcolor=#fefefe
| 241665 ||  || — || July 23, 2000 || Socorro || LINEAR || — || align=right | 2.8 km || 
|-id=666 bgcolor=#fefefe
| 241666 ||  || — || July 30, 2000 || Socorro || LINEAR || — || align=right | 1.3 km || 
|-id=667 bgcolor=#fefefe
| 241667 ||  || — || July 30, 2000 || Socorro || LINEAR || — || align=right | 2.3 km || 
|-id=668 bgcolor=#fefefe
| 241668 ||  || — || July 29, 2000 || Anderson Mesa || LONEOS || V || align=right | 1.0 km || 
|-id=669 bgcolor=#fefefe
| 241669 ||  || — || July 29, 2000 || Anderson Mesa || LONEOS || — || align=right | 2.0 km || 
|-id=670 bgcolor=#E9E9E9
| 241670 ||  || — || August 2, 2000 || Socorro || LINEAR || — || align=right | 2.5 km || 
|-id=671 bgcolor=#E9E9E9
| 241671 ||  || — || August 24, 2000 || Socorro || LINEAR || MIS || align=right | 2.6 km || 
|-id=672 bgcolor=#fefefe
| 241672 ||  || — || August 28, 2000 || Socorro || LINEAR || — || align=right data-sort-value="0.87" | 870 m || 
|-id=673 bgcolor=#FA8072
| 241673 ||  || — || August 26, 2000 || Socorro || LINEAR || — || align=right | 2.0 km || 
|-id=674 bgcolor=#E9E9E9
| 241674 ||  || — || August 24, 2000 || Socorro || LINEAR || — || align=right | 4.2 km || 
|-id=675 bgcolor=#E9E9E9
| 241675 ||  || — || August 24, 2000 || Socorro || LINEAR || — || align=right | 2.1 km || 
|-id=676 bgcolor=#FA8072
| 241676 ||  || — || August 31, 2000 || Socorro || LINEAR || — || align=right | 1.2 km || 
|-id=677 bgcolor=#d6d6d6
| 241677 ||  || — || August 31, 2000 || Socorro || LINEAR || — || align=right | 6.0 km || 
|-id=678 bgcolor=#fefefe
| 241678 ||  || — || August 31, 2000 || Socorro || LINEAR || — || align=right | 1.3 km || 
|-id=679 bgcolor=#E9E9E9
| 241679 ||  || — || August 26, 2000 || Socorro || LINEAR || ADE || align=right | 3.7 km || 
|-id=680 bgcolor=#fefefe
| 241680 ||  || — || August 31, 2000 || Socorro || LINEAR || EUT || align=right data-sort-value="0.78" | 780 m || 
|-id=681 bgcolor=#d6d6d6
| 241681 ||  || — || September 1, 2000 || River Oaks || W. Holliday || — || align=right | 6.0 km || 
|-id=682 bgcolor=#fefefe
| 241682 ||  || — || September 1, 2000 || Socorro || LINEAR || — || align=right | 1.9 km || 
|-id=683 bgcolor=#d6d6d6
| 241683 ||  || — || September 1, 2000 || Socorro || LINEAR || TIR || align=right | 4.0 km || 
|-id=684 bgcolor=#d6d6d6
| 241684 ||  || — || September 2, 2000 || Anderson Mesa || LONEOS || — || align=right | 5.3 km || 
|-id=685 bgcolor=#E9E9E9
| 241685 ||  || — || September 2, 2000 || Anderson Mesa || LONEOS || — || align=right | 2.7 km || 
|-id=686 bgcolor=#E9E9E9
| 241686 ||  || — || September 5, 2000 || Anderson Mesa || LONEOS || MIT || align=right | 3.4 km || 
|-id=687 bgcolor=#d6d6d6
| 241687 ||  || — || September 23, 2000 || Socorro || LINEAR || EOS || align=right | 2.9 km || 
|-id=688 bgcolor=#d6d6d6
| 241688 ||  || — || September 23, 2000 || Socorro || LINEAR || — || align=right | 4.8 km || 
|-id=689 bgcolor=#d6d6d6
| 241689 ||  || — || September 23, 2000 || Socorro || LINEAR || — || align=right | 2.7 km || 
|-id=690 bgcolor=#fefefe
| 241690 ||  || — || September 24, 2000 || Socorro || LINEAR || — || align=right data-sort-value="0.83" | 830 m || 
|-id=691 bgcolor=#E9E9E9
| 241691 ||  || — || September 24, 2000 || Socorro || LINEAR || — || align=right | 2.5 km || 
|-id=692 bgcolor=#E9E9E9
| 241692 ||  || — || September 23, 2000 || Socorro || LINEAR || — || align=right | 2.9 km || 
|-id=693 bgcolor=#fefefe
| 241693 ||  || — || September 23, 2000 || Socorro || LINEAR || V || align=right data-sort-value="0.94" | 940 m || 
|-id=694 bgcolor=#d6d6d6
| 241694 ||  || — || September 24, 2000 || Socorro || LINEAR || — || align=right | 4.3 km || 
|-id=695 bgcolor=#d6d6d6
| 241695 ||  || — || September 23, 2000 || Socorro || LINEAR || — || align=right | 4.3 km || 
|-id=696 bgcolor=#fefefe
| 241696 ||  || — || September 23, 2000 || Socorro || LINEAR || V || align=right data-sort-value="0.96" | 960 m || 
|-id=697 bgcolor=#fefefe
| 241697 ||  || — || September 23, 2000 || Socorro || LINEAR || — || align=right | 1.3 km || 
|-id=698 bgcolor=#d6d6d6
| 241698 ||  || — || September 23, 2000 || Socorro || LINEAR || EOS || align=right | 3.1 km || 
|-id=699 bgcolor=#fefefe
| 241699 ||  || — || September 23, 2000 || Socorro || LINEAR || V || align=right | 1.1 km || 
|-id=700 bgcolor=#fefefe
| 241700 ||  || — || September 28, 2000 || Socorro || LINEAR || — || align=right | 2.1 km || 
|}

241701–241800 

|-bgcolor=#fefefe
| 241701 ||  || — || September 24, 2000 || Socorro || LINEAR || — || align=right | 1.2 km || 
|-id=702 bgcolor=#E9E9E9
| 241702 ||  || — || September 24, 2000 || Socorro || LINEAR || — || align=right | 4.0 km || 
|-id=703 bgcolor=#fefefe
| 241703 ||  || — || September 27, 2000 || Socorro || LINEAR || — || align=right | 1.5 km || 
|-id=704 bgcolor=#E9E9E9
| 241704 ||  || — || September 27, 2000 || Socorro || LINEAR || MIT || align=right | 3.4 km || 
|-id=705 bgcolor=#fefefe
| 241705 ||  || — || September 30, 2000 || Socorro || LINEAR || FLO || align=right | 1.6 km || 
|-id=706 bgcolor=#d6d6d6
| 241706 ||  || — || September 24, 2000 || Socorro || LINEAR || TIR || align=right | 5.4 km || 
|-id=707 bgcolor=#d6d6d6
| 241707 ||  || — || September 30, 2000 || Anderson Mesa || LONEOS || EOS || align=right | 3.1 km || 
|-id=708 bgcolor=#d6d6d6
| 241708 ||  || — || September 30, 2000 || Anderson Mesa || LONEOS || — || align=right | 7.1 km || 
|-id=709 bgcolor=#E9E9E9
| 241709 ||  || — || September 26, 2000 || Haleakala || NEAT || JUN || align=right | 1.7 km || 
|-id=710 bgcolor=#d6d6d6
| 241710 ||  || — || September 21, 2000 || Kitt Peak || Spacewatch || 7:4 || align=right | 6.5 km || 
|-id=711 bgcolor=#fefefe
| 241711 ||  || — || October 1, 2000 || Prescott || P. G. Comba || NYS || align=right | 1.8 km || 
|-id=712 bgcolor=#d6d6d6
| 241712 ||  || — || October 1, 2000 || Socorro || LINEAR || — || align=right | 5.6 km || 
|-id=713 bgcolor=#E9E9E9
| 241713 ||  || — || October 3, 2000 || Socorro || LINEAR || ADE || align=right | 2.4 km || 
|-id=714 bgcolor=#d6d6d6
| 241714 ||  || — || October 3, 2000 || Socorro || LINEAR || — || align=right | 3.2 km || 
|-id=715 bgcolor=#E9E9E9
| 241715 ||  || — || October 3, 2000 || Socorro || LINEAR || — || align=right | 3.0 km || 
|-id=716 bgcolor=#fefefe
| 241716 ||  || — || October 24, 2000 || Socorro || LINEAR || ERI || align=right | 2.4 km || 
|-id=717 bgcolor=#fefefe
| 241717 ||  || — || October 24, 2000 || Socorro || LINEAR || KLI || align=right | 3.3 km || 
|-id=718 bgcolor=#fefefe
| 241718 ||  || — || October 24, 2000 || Socorro || LINEAR || FLO || align=right | 1.1 km || 
|-id=719 bgcolor=#d6d6d6
| 241719 ||  || — || October 24, 2000 || Socorro || LINEAR || — || align=right | 5.6 km || 
|-id=720 bgcolor=#d6d6d6
| 241720 ||  || — || October 24, 2000 || Socorro || LINEAR || — || align=right | 3.9 km || 
|-id=721 bgcolor=#d6d6d6
| 241721 ||  || — || October 24, 2000 || Socorro || LINEAR || JLI || align=right | 4.9 km || 
|-id=722 bgcolor=#d6d6d6
| 241722 ||  || — || October 31, 2000 || Socorro || LINEAR || — || align=right | 4.9 km || 
|-id=723 bgcolor=#fefefe
| 241723 ||  || — || October 25, 2000 || Socorro || LINEAR || V || align=right | 1.0 km || 
|-id=724 bgcolor=#d6d6d6
| 241724 ||  || — || October 25, 2000 || Socorro || LINEAR || — || align=right | 4.7 km || 
|-id=725 bgcolor=#d6d6d6
| 241725 ||  || — || November 1, 2000 || Kitt Peak || Spacewatch || — || align=right | 3.6 km || 
|-id=726 bgcolor=#fefefe
| 241726 ||  || — || November 1, 2000 || Socorro || LINEAR || V || align=right | 1.1 km || 
|-id=727 bgcolor=#fefefe
| 241727 ||  || — || November 1, 2000 || Socorro || LINEAR || V || align=right data-sort-value="0.78" | 780 m || 
|-id=728 bgcolor=#fefefe
| 241728 ||  || — || November 1, 2000 || Socorro || LINEAR || EUT || align=right data-sort-value="0.96" | 960 m || 
|-id=729 bgcolor=#E9E9E9
| 241729 ||  || — || November 1, 2000 || Socorro || LINEAR || — || align=right | 4.0 km || 
|-id=730 bgcolor=#d6d6d6
| 241730 ||  || — || November 2, 2000 || Socorro || LINEAR || — || align=right | 7.5 km || 
|-id=731 bgcolor=#d6d6d6
| 241731 ||  || — || November 2, 2000 || Socorro || LINEAR || AEG || align=right | 5.5 km || 
|-id=732 bgcolor=#E9E9E9
| 241732 ||  || — || November 17, 2000 || Socorro || LINEAR || — || align=right | 3.9 km || 
|-id=733 bgcolor=#d6d6d6
| 241733 ||  || — || November 21, 2000 || Socorro || LINEAR || URS || align=right | 3.2 km || 
|-id=734 bgcolor=#d6d6d6
| 241734 ||  || — || November 21, 2000 || Socorro || LINEAR || — || align=right | 3.3 km || 
|-id=735 bgcolor=#d6d6d6
| 241735 ||  || — || November 20, 2000 || Anderson Mesa || LONEOS || — || align=right | 2.6 km || 
|-id=736 bgcolor=#fefefe
| 241736 ||  || — || November 20, 2000 || Socorro || LINEAR || NYS || align=right | 1.6 km || 
|-id=737 bgcolor=#d6d6d6
| 241737 ||  || — || November 19, 2000 || Socorro || LINEAR || Tj (2.9) || align=right | 7.4 km || 
|-id=738 bgcolor=#d6d6d6
| 241738 ||  || — || November 18, 2000 || Anderson Mesa || LONEOS || — || align=right | 3.6 km || 
|-id=739 bgcolor=#d6d6d6
| 241739 ||  || — || December 1, 2000 || Socorro || LINEAR || — || align=right | 6.2 km || 
|-id=740 bgcolor=#E9E9E9
| 241740 ||  || — || December 4, 2000 || Socorro || LINEAR || MIT || align=right | 3.7 km || 
|-id=741 bgcolor=#E9E9E9
| 241741 ||  || — || December 5, 2000 || Socorro || LINEAR || — || align=right | 3.5 km || 
|-id=742 bgcolor=#E9E9E9
| 241742 ||  || — || December 22, 2000 || Socorro || LINEAR || — || align=right | 1.8 km || 
|-id=743 bgcolor=#d6d6d6
| 241743 ||  || — || December 30, 2000 || Socorro || LINEAR || — || align=right | 5.9 km || 
|-id=744 bgcolor=#fefefe
| 241744 ||  || — || December 27, 2000 || Kitt Peak || Spacewatch || V || align=right | 1.4 km || 
|-id=745 bgcolor=#d6d6d6
| 241745 ||  || — || December 30, 2000 || Socorro || LINEAR || — || align=right | 4.2 km || 
|-id=746 bgcolor=#fefefe
| 241746 ||  || — || December 30, 2000 || Socorro || LINEAR || — || align=right | 1.4 km || 
|-id=747 bgcolor=#d6d6d6
| 241747 ||  || — || January 5, 2001 || Socorro || LINEAR || — || align=right | 5.8 km || 
|-id=748 bgcolor=#d6d6d6
| 241748 ||  || — || January 4, 2001 || Socorro || LINEAR || TIR || align=right | 3.4 km || 
|-id=749 bgcolor=#E9E9E9
| 241749 ||  || — || January 3, 2001 || Anderson Mesa || LONEOS || — || align=right | 3.2 km || 
|-id=750 bgcolor=#E9E9E9
| 241750 ||  || — || January 19, 2001 || Socorro || LINEAR || MIT || align=right | 3.7 km || 
|-id=751 bgcolor=#E9E9E9
| 241751 ||  || — || January 16, 2001 || Haleakala || NEAT || — || align=right | 4.9 km || 
|-id=752 bgcolor=#fefefe
| 241752 ||  || — || January 21, 2001 || Socorro || LINEAR || PHO || align=right | 3.2 km || 
|-id=753 bgcolor=#E9E9E9
| 241753 ||  || — || January 19, 2001 || Socorro || LINEAR || — || align=right | 2.3 km || 
|-id=754 bgcolor=#C2FFFF
| 241754 ||  || — || February 1, 2001 || Socorro || LINEAR || L4 || align=right | 14 km || 
|-id=755 bgcolor=#E9E9E9
| 241755 ||  || — || February 13, 2001 || Socorro || LINEAR || — || align=right | 1.8 km || 
|-id=756 bgcolor=#E9E9E9
| 241756 ||  || — || February 16, 2001 || Socorro || LINEAR || — || align=right | 4.1 km || 
|-id=757 bgcolor=#E9E9E9
| 241757 ||  || — || February 17, 2001 || Socorro || LINEAR || — || align=right | 1.5 km || 
|-id=758 bgcolor=#E9E9E9
| 241758 ||  || — || February 17, 2001 || Socorro || LINEAR || — || align=right | 1.5 km || 
|-id=759 bgcolor=#d6d6d6
| 241759 ||  || — || February 19, 2001 || Socorro || LINEAR || — || align=right | 6.2 km || 
|-id=760 bgcolor=#E9E9E9
| 241760 ||  || — || February 19, 2001 || Socorro || LINEAR || — || align=right | 1.4 km || 
|-id=761 bgcolor=#E9E9E9
| 241761 ||  || — || February 20, 2001 || Haleakala || NEAT || — || align=right | 2.2 km || 
|-id=762 bgcolor=#E9E9E9
| 241762 ||  || — || February 16, 2001 || Socorro || LINEAR || — || align=right | 1.7 km || 
|-id=763 bgcolor=#E9E9E9
| 241763 ||  || — || March 19, 2001 || Socorro || LINEAR || — || align=right | 2.5 km || 
|-id=764 bgcolor=#E9E9E9
| 241764 ||  || — || March 19, 2001 || Socorro || LINEAR || — || align=right | 2.4 km || 
|-id=765 bgcolor=#E9E9E9
| 241765 ||  || — || March 16, 2001 || Socorro || LINEAR || — || align=right | 2.4 km || 
|-id=766 bgcolor=#E9E9E9
| 241766 ||  || — || March 17, 2001 || Socorro || LINEAR || EUN || align=right | 1.8 km || 
|-id=767 bgcolor=#d6d6d6
| 241767 ||  || — || March 23, 2001 || Anderson Mesa || LONEOS || URS || align=right | 5.7 km || 
|-id=768 bgcolor=#E9E9E9
| 241768 ||  || — || March 24, 2001 || Haleakala || NEAT || EUN || align=right | 2.1 km || 
|-id=769 bgcolor=#E9E9E9
| 241769 ||  || — || March 24, 2001 || Haleakala || NEAT || — || align=right | 2.8 km || 
|-id=770 bgcolor=#E9E9E9
| 241770 ||  || — || March 20, 2001 || Anderson Mesa || LONEOS || RAF || align=right | 1.6 km || 
|-id=771 bgcolor=#fefefe
| 241771 ||  || — || April 17, 2001 || Socorro || LINEAR || — || align=right | 2.9 km || 
|-id=772 bgcolor=#E9E9E9
| 241772 ||  || — || April 30, 2001 || Kitt Peak || Spacewatch || — || align=right | 2.3 km || 
|-id=773 bgcolor=#E9E9E9
| 241773 ||  || — || May 15, 2001 || Kitt Peak || Spacewatch || — || align=right | 3.2 km || 
|-id=774 bgcolor=#E9E9E9
| 241774 ||  || — || May 16, 2001 || Socorro || LINEAR || PAL || align=right | 3.7 km || 
|-id=775 bgcolor=#E9E9E9
| 241775 ||  || — || May 24, 2001 || Socorro || LINEAR || MIT || align=right | 3.8 km || 
|-id=776 bgcolor=#E9E9E9
| 241776 ||  || — || June 21, 2001 || Palomar || NEAT || — || align=right | 3.3 km || 
|-id=777 bgcolor=#d6d6d6
| 241777 ||  || — || July 13, 2001 || Palomar || NEAT || — || align=right | 3.4 km || 
|-id=778 bgcolor=#d6d6d6
| 241778 ||  || — || July 13, 2001 || Palomar || NEAT || EOS || align=right | 3.8 km || 
|-id=779 bgcolor=#d6d6d6
| 241779 ||  || — || July 13, 2001 || Palomar || NEAT || — || align=right | 5.9 km || 
|-id=780 bgcolor=#E9E9E9
| 241780 || 2001 OK || — || July 17, 2001 || Badlands || Badlands Obs. || — || align=right | 1.8 km || 
|-id=781 bgcolor=#E9E9E9
| 241781 ||  || — || July 21, 2001 || Anderson Mesa || LONEOS || — || align=right | 1.6 km || 
|-id=782 bgcolor=#E9E9E9
| 241782 ||  || — || July 19, 2001 || Palomar || NEAT || — || align=right | 4.1 km || 
|-id=783 bgcolor=#d6d6d6
| 241783 ||  || — || July 31, 2001 || Palomar || NEAT || — || align=right | 5.6 km || 
|-id=784 bgcolor=#d6d6d6
| 241784 ||  || — || July 25, 2001 || Haleakala || NEAT || — || align=right | 4.3 km || 
|-id=785 bgcolor=#E9E9E9
| 241785 ||  || — || July 29, 2001 || Socorro || LINEAR || EUN || align=right | 2.3 km || 
|-id=786 bgcolor=#E9E9E9
| 241786 ||  || — || August 10, 2001 || Palomar || NEAT || — || align=right | 1.7 km || 
|-id=787 bgcolor=#d6d6d6
| 241787 ||  || — || August 12, 2001 || Ondřejov || P. Kušnirák || — || align=right | 6.8 km || 
|-id=788 bgcolor=#E9E9E9
| 241788 ||  || — || August 10, 2001 || Palomar || NEAT || — || align=right | 4.1 km || 
|-id=789 bgcolor=#d6d6d6
| 241789 ||  || — || August 11, 2001 || Palomar || NEAT || Tj (2.94) || align=right | 6.9 km || 
|-id=790 bgcolor=#d6d6d6
| 241790 ||  || — || August 11, 2001 || Palomar || NEAT || LIX || align=right | 9.1 km || 
|-id=791 bgcolor=#fefefe
| 241791 ||  || — || August 15, 2001 || Bergisch Gladbac || W. Bickel || KLI || align=right | 2.9 km || 
|-id=792 bgcolor=#E9E9E9
| 241792 ||  || — || August 14, 2001 || Haleakala || NEAT || INO || align=right | 2.1 km || 
|-id=793 bgcolor=#E9E9E9
| 241793 ||  || — || August 16, 2001 || Socorro || LINEAR || — || align=right | 1.9 km || 
|-id=794 bgcolor=#d6d6d6
| 241794 ||  || — || August 16, 2001 || Socorro || LINEAR || — || align=right | 5.2 km || 
|-id=795 bgcolor=#d6d6d6
| 241795 ||  || — || August 24, 2001 || Ondřejov || P. Kušnirák || — || align=right | 3.1 km || 
|-id=796 bgcolor=#d6d6d6
| 241796 ||  || — || August 22, 2001 || Socorro || LINEAR || — || align=right | 5.4 km || 
|-id=797 bgcolor=#d6d6d6
| 241797 ||  || — || August 22, 2001 || Socorro || LINEAR || URS || align=right | 7.2 km || 
|-id=798 bgcolor=#d6d6d6
| 241798 ||  || — || August 22, 2001 || Socorro || LINEAR || URS || align=right | 6.2 km || 
|-id=799 bgcolor=#d6d6d6
| 241799 ||  || — || August 22, 2001 || Socorro || LINEAR || — || align=right | 4.2 km || 
|-id=800 bgcolor=#E9E9E9
| 241800 ||  || — || August 22, 2001 || Palomar || NEAT || — || align=right | 4.2 km || 
|}

241801–241900 

|-bgcolor=#d6d6d6
| 241801 ||  || — || August 24, 2001 || Anderson Mesa || LONEOS || 629 || align=right | 1.6 km || 
|-id=802 bgcolor=#E9E9E9
| 241802 ||  || — || August 25, 2001 || Socorro || LINEAR || — || align=right | 4.1 km || 
|-id=803 bgcolor=#d6d6d6
| 241803 ||  || — || August 19, 2001 || Socorro || LINEAR || — || align=right | 4.6 km || 
|-id=804 bgcolor=#E9E9E9
| 241804 ||  || — || August 19, 2001 || Haleakala || NEAT || INO || align=right | 2.6 km || 
|-id=805 bgcolor=#E9E9E9
| 241805 ||  || — || August 21, 2001 || Cerro Tololo || Cerro Tololo Obs. || — || align=right | 2.6 km || 
|-id=806 bgcolor=#fefefe
| 241806 ||  || — || August 19, 2001 || Socorro || LINEAR || — || align=right | 2.8 km || 
|-id=807 bgcolor=#E9E9E9
| 241807 ||  || — || September 8, 2001 || Goodricke-Pigott || R. A. Tucker || — || align=right | 1.6 km || 
|-id=808 bgcolor=#E9E9E9
| 241808 ||  || — || September 8, 2001 || Socorro || LINEAR || PAL || align=right | 4.5 km || 
|-id=809 bgcolor=#d6d6d6
| 241809 ||  || — || September 10, 2001 || Socorro || LINEAR || — || align=right | 8.0 km || 
|-id=810 bgcolor=#d6d6d6
| 241810 ||  || — || September 10, 2001 || Socorro || LINEAR || EOS || align=right | 2.8 km || 
|-id=811 bgcolor=#d6d6d6
| 241811 ||  || — || September 11, 2001 || Socorro || LINEAR || ALA || align=right | 5.4 km || 
|-id=812 bgcolor=#fefefe
| 241812 ||  || — || September 12, 2001 || Socorro || LINEAR || — || align=right | 1.5 km || 
|-id=813 bgcolor=#d6d6d6
| 241813 ||  || — || September 12, 2001 || Socorro || LINEAR || — || align=right | 5.4 km || 
|-id=814 bgcolor=#d6d6d6
| 241814 ||  || — || September 11, 2001 || Anderson Mesa || LONEOS || — || align=right | 4.4 km || 
|-id=815 bgcolor=#d6d6d6
| 241815 ||  || — || September 12, 2001 || Socorro || LINEAR || EOS || align=right | 5.8 km || 
|-id=816 bgcolor=#d6d6d6
| 241816 ||  || — || September 16, 2001 || Socorro || LINEAR || — || align=right | 5.0 km || 
|-id=817 bgcolor=#d6d6d6
| 241817 ||  || — || September 16, 2001 || Socorro || LINEAR || — || align=right | 4.9 km || 
|-id=818 bgcolor=#E9E9E9
| 241818 ||  || — || September 17, 2001 || Socorro || LINEAR || — || align=right | 1.7 km || 
|-id=819 bgcolor=#E9E9E9
| 241819 ||  || — || September 19, 2001 || Anderson Mesa || LONEOS || INO || align=right | 1.9 km || 
|-id=820 bgcolor=#d6d6d6
| 241820 ||  || — || September 20, 2001 || Socorro || LINEAR || — || align=right | 5.4 km || 
|-id=821 bgcolor=#d6d6d6
| 241821 ||  || — || September 20, 2001 || Socorro || LINEAR || — || align=right | 3.5 km || 
|-id=822 bgcolor=#E9E9E9
| 241822 ||  || — || September 20, 2001 || Socorro || LINEAR || DOR || align=right | 5.3 km || 
|-id=823 bgcolor=#d6d6d6
| 241823 ||  || — || September 16, 2001 || Socorro || LINEAR || — || align=right | 6.5 km || 
|-id=824 bgcolor=#d6d6d6
| 241824 ||  || — || September 16, 2001 || Socorro || LINEAR || LIX || align=right | 6.6 km || 
|-id=825 bgcolor=#d6d6d6
| 241825 ||  || — || September 16, 2001 || Socorro || LINEAR || — || align=right | 5.3 km || 
|-id=826 bgcolor=#E9E9E9
| 241826 ||  || — || September 19, 2001 || Socorro || LINEAR || POS || align=right | 3.4 km || 
|-id=827 bgcolor=#d6d6d6
| 241827 ||  || — || September 19, 2001 || Socorro || LINEAR || THM || align=right | 3.3 km || 
|-id=828 bgcolor=#E9E9E9
| 241828 ||  || — || September 19, 2001 || Socorro || LINEAR || — || align=right | 3.0 km || 
|-id=829 bgcolor=#E9E9E9
| 241829 ||  || — || September 19, 2001 || Socorro || LINEAR || PAD || align=right | 2.9 km || 
|-id=830 bgcolor=#d6d6d6
| 241830 ||  || — || September 19, 2001 || Socorro || LINEAR || — || align=right | 4.2 km || 
|-id=831 bgcolor=#E9E9E9
| 241831 ||  || — || September 19, 2001 || Socorro || LINEAR || HNA || align=right | 3.5 km || 
|-id=832 bgcolor=#d6d6d6
| 241832 ||  || — || September 19, 2001 || Socorro || LINEAR || — || align=right | 4.8 km || 
|-id=833 bgcolor=#fefefe
| 241833 ||  || — || September 20, 2001 || Socorro || LINEAR || — || align=right data-sort-value="0.72" | 720 m || 
|-id=834 bgcolor=#d6d6d6
| 241834 ||  || — || September 29, 2001 || Palomar || NEAT || — || align=right | 6.3 km || 
|-id=835 bgcolor=#E9E9E9
| 241835 ||  || — || September 19, 2001 || Socorro || LINEAR || AST || align=right | 2.9 km || 
|-id=836 bgcolor=#E9E9E9
| 241836 ||  || — || September 20, 2001 || Socorro || LINEAR || — || align=right | 3.3 km || 
|-id=837 bgcolor=#d6d6d6
| 241837 ||  || — || September 21, 2001 || Socorro || LINEAR || — || align=right | 6.5 km || 
|-id=838 bgcolor=#d6d6d6
| 241838 ||  || — || September 21, 2001 || Socorro || LINEAR || — || align=right | 5.2 km || 
|-id=839 bgcolor=#d6d6d6
| 241839 ||  || — || September 21, 2001 || Anderson Mesa || LONEOS || EUP || align=right | 6.6 km || 
|-id=840 bgcolor=#E9E9E9
| 241840 ||  || — || September 21, 2001 || Palomar || NEAT || — || align=right | 3.9 km || 
|-id=841 bgcolor=#d6d6d6
| 241841 ||  || — || September 21, 2001 || Anderson Mesa || LONEOS || EUP || align=right | 6.2 km || 
|-id=842 bgcolor=#d6d6d6
| 241842 ||  || — || September 25, 2001 || Socorro || LINEAR || URS || align=right | 6.5 km || 
|-id=843 bgcolor=#d6d6d6
| 241843 ||  || — || October 13, 2001 || Socorro || LINEAR || — || align=right | 3.4 km || 
|-id=844 bgcolor=#d6d6d6
| 241844 ||  || — || October 11, 2001 || Socorro || LINEAR || EUP || align=right | 7.0 km || 
|-id=845 bgcolor=#d6d6d6
| 241845 ||  || — || October 6, 2001 || Palomar || NEAT || URS || align=right | 7.0 km || 
|-id=846 bgcolor=#d6d6d6
| 241846 ||  || — || October 14, 2001 || Socorro || LINEAR || — || align=right | 4.0 km || 
|-id=847 bgcolor=#d6d6d6
| 241847 ||  || — || October 14, 2001 || Socorro || LINEAR || — || align=right | 4.8 km || 
|-id=848 bgcolor=#fefefe
| 241848 ||  || — || October 13, 2001 || Socorro || LINEAR || FLO || align=right data-sort-value="0.88" | 880 m || 
|-id=849 bgcolor=#d6d6d6
| 241849 ||  || — || October 14, 2001 || Socorro || LINEAR || HYG || align=right | 3.5 km || 
|-id=850 bgcolor=#E9E9E9
| 241850 ||  || — || October 14, 2001 || Socorro || LINEAR || NEM || align=right | 3.1 km || 
|-id=851 bgcolor=#d6d6d6
| 241851 ||  || — || October 14, 2001 || Socorro || LINEAR || — || align=right | 4.6 km || 
|-id=852 bgcolor=#fefefe
| 241852 ||  || — || October 14, 2001 || Socorro || LINEAR || NYS || align=right | 2.2 km || 
|-id=853 bgcolor=#E9E9E9
| 241853 ||  || — || October 14, 2001 || Socorro || LINEAR || HOF || align=right | 3.4 km || 
|-id=854 bgcolor=#d6d6d6
| 241854 ||  || — || October 15, 2001 || Desert Eagle || W. K. Y. Yeung || — || align=right | 5.0 km || 
|-id=855 bgcolor=#E9E9E9
| 241855 ||  || — || October 14, 2001 || Socorro || LINEAR || DOR || align=right | 4.0 km || 
|-id=856 bgcolor=#d6d6d6
| 241856 ||  || — || October 15, 2001 || Socorro || LINEAR || — || align=right | 4.3 km || 
|-id=857 bgcolor=#d6d6d6
| 241857 ||  || — || October 13, 2001 || Palomar || NEAT || — || align=right | 4.5 km || 
|-id=858 bgcolor=#d6d6d6
| 241858 ||  || — || October 15, 2001 || Palomar || NEAT || Tj (2.96) || align=right | 7.5 km || 
|-id=859 bgcolor=#d6d6d6
| 241859 ||  || — || October 13, 2001 || Anderson Mesa || LONEOS || — || align=right | 7.4 km || 
|-id=860 bgcolor=#d6d6d6
| 241860 ||  || — || October 14, 2001 || Socorro || LINEAR || ALA || align=right | 4.9 km || 
|-id=861 bgcolor=#d6d6d6
| 241861 ||  || — || October 14, 2001 || Socorro || LINEAR || — || align=right | 4.1 km || 
|-id=862 bgcolor=#E9E9E9
| 241862 ||  || — || October 14, 2001 || Socorro || LINEAR || — || align=right | 3.3 km || 
|-id=863 bgcolor=#d6d6d6
| 241863 ||  || — || October 14, 2001 || Socorro || LINEAR || — || align=right | 4.0 km || 
|-id=864 bgcolor=#d6d6d6
| 241864 ||  || — || October 11, 2001 || Socorro || LINEAR || — || align=right | 5.7 km || 
|-id=865 bgcolor=#d6d6d6
| 241865 ||  || — || October 11, 2001 || Socorro || LINEAR || 615 || align=right | 2.4 km || 
|-id=866 bgcolor=#d6d6d6
| 241866 ||  || — || October 13, 2001 || Palomar || NEAT || — || align=right | 4.3 km || 
|-id=867 bgcolor=#d6d6d6
| 241867 ||  || — || October 13, 2001 || Palomar || NEAT || — || align=right | 6.7 km || 
|-id=868 bgcolor=#d6d6d6
| 241868 ||  || — || October 14, 2001 || Socorro || LINEAR || — || align=right | 4.7 km || 
|-id=869 bgcolor=#d6d6d6
| 241869 ||  || — || October 14, 2001 || Socorro || LINEAR || EOS || align=right | 3.3 km || 
|-id=870 bgcolor=#d6d6d6
| 241870 ||  || — || October 15, 2001 || Kitt Peak || Spacewatch || — || align=right | 3.6 km || 
|-id=871 bgcolor=#E9E9E9
| 241871 ||  || — || October 17, 2001 || Socorro || LINEAR || GER || align=right | 1.5 km || 
|-id=872 bgcolor=#d6d6d6
| 241872 ||  || — || October 23, 2001 || Socorro || LINEAR || — || align=right | 7.2 km || 
|-id=873 bgcolor=#d6d6d6
| 241873 ||  || — || October 17, 2001 || Socorro || LINEAR || — || align=right | 5.2 km || 
|-id=874 bgcolor=#E9E9E9
| 241874 ||  || — || October 21, 2001 || Kitt Peak || Spacewatch || — || align=right | 1.8 km || 
|-id=875 bgcolor=#d6d6d6
| 241875 ||  || — || October 18, 2001 || Palomar || NEAT || — || align=right | 6.1 km || 
|-id=876 bgcolor=#d6d6d6
| 241876 ||  || — || October 22, 2001 || Socorro || LINEAR || EOS || align=right | 3.1 km || 
|-id=877 bgcolor=#d6d6d6
| 241877 ||  || — || October 23, 2001 || Socorro || LINEAR || — || align=right | 4.5 km || 
|-id=878 bgcolor=#fefefe
| 241878 ||  || — || October 19, 2001 || Palomar || NEAT || ERI || align=right | 2.3 km || 
|-id=879 bgcolor=#d6d6d6
| 241879 ||  || — || October 17, 2001 || Palomar || NEAT || — || align=right | 4.9 km || 
|-id=880 bgcolor=#d6d6d6
| 241880 ||  || — || October 19, 2001 || Palomar || NEAT || — || align=right | 4.5 km || 
|-id=881 bgcolor=#d6d6d6
| 241881 ||  || — || October 21, 2001 || Socorro || LINEAR || — || align=right | 7.1 km || 
|-id=882 bgcolor=#fefefe
| 241882 ||  || — || November 9, 2001 || Socorro || LINEAR || FLO || align=right data-sort-value="0.80" | 800 m || 
|-id=883 bgcolor=#fefefe
| 241883 ||  || — || November 9, 2001 || Socorro || LINEAR || — || align=right | 3.1 km || 
|-id=884 bgcolor=#d6d6d6
| 241884 ||  || — || November 9, 2001 || Socorro || LINEAR || 615 || align=right | 3.0 km || 
|-id=885 bgcolor=#d6d6d6
| 241885 ||  || — || November 9, 2001 || Socorro || LINEAR || — || align=right | 4.2 km || 
|-id=886 bgcolor=#d6d6d6
| 241886 ||  || — || November 9, 2001 || Socorro || LINEAR || EUP || align=right | 6.5 km || 
|-id=887 bgcolor=#E9E9E9
| 241887 ||  || — || November 10, 2001 || Socorro || LINEAR || — || align=right | 3.0 km || 
|-id=888 bgcolor=#d6d6d6
| 241888 ||  || — || November 15, 2001 || Socorro || LINEAR || — || align=right | 5.7 km || 
|-id=889 bgcolor=#d6d6d6
| 241889 ||  || — || November 15, 2001 || Socorro || LINEAR || — || align=right | 4.3 km || 
|-id=890 bgcolor=#fefefe
| 241890 ||  || — || November 12, 2001 || Socorro || LINEAR || KLI || align=right | 2.8 km || 
|-id=891 bgcolor=#d6d6d6
| 241891 ||  || — || November 17, 2001 || Socorro || LINEAR || — || align=right | 3.1 km || 
|-id=892 bgcolor=#E9E9E9
| 241892 ||  || — || November 17, 2001 || Socorro || LINEAR || BRU || align=right | 3.0 km || 
|-id=893 bgcolor=#d6d6d6
| 241893 ||  || — || November 17, 2001 || Socorro || LINEAR || HYG || align=right | 4.1 km || 
|-id=894 bgcolor=#fefefe
| 241894 ||  || — || November 17, 2001 || Socorro || LINEAR || — || align=right | 3.3 km || 
|-id=895 bgcolor=#E9E9E9
| 241895 ||  || — || November 18, 2001 || Socorro || LINEAR || DOR || align=right | 4.3 km || 
|-id=896 bgcolor=#fefefe
| 241896 ||  || — || November 20, 2001 || Socorro || LINEAR || — || align=right | 1.8 km || 
|-id=897 bgcolor=#E9E9E9
| 241897 ||  || — || December 10, 2001 || Socorro || LINEAR || BAR || align=right | 2.5 km || 
|-id=898 bgcolor=#d6d6d6
| 241898 ||  || — || December 11, 2001 || Socorro || LINEAR || — || align=right | 3.0 km || 
|-id=899 bgcolor=#d6d6d6
| 241899 ||  || — || December 14, 2001 || Socorro || LINEAR || — || align=right | 3.4 km || 
|-id=900 bgcolor=#d6d6d6
| 241900 ||  || — || December 14, 2001 || Socorro || LINEAR || HYG || align=right | 3.7 km || 
|}

241901–242000 

|-bgcolor=#E9E9E9
| 241901 ||  || — || December 14, 2001 || Socorro || LINEAR || — || align=right | 1.6 km || 
|-id=902 bgcolor=#d6d6d6
| 241902 ||  || — || December 14, 2001 || Socorro || LINEAR || — || align=right | 6.6 km || 
|-id=903 bgcolor=#E9E9E9
| 241903 ||  || — || December 11, 2001 || Socorro || LINEAR || — || align=right | 3.0 km || 
|-id=904 bgcolor=#E9E9E9
| 241904 ||  || — || December 11, 2001 || Socorro || LINEAR || — || align=right | 3.5 km || 
|-id=905 bgcolor=#fefefe
| 241905 ||  || — || December 9, 2001 || Anderson Mesa || LONEOS || FLO || align=right data-sort-value="0.84" | 840 m || 
|-id=906 bgcolor=#d6d6d6
| 241906 ||  || — || December 18, 2001 || Socorro || LINEAR || EUP || align=right | 7.5 km || 
|-id=907 bgcolor=#d6d6d6
| 241907 ||  || — || December 17, 2001 || Socorro || LINEAR || — || align=right | 3.4 km || 
|-id=908 bgcolor=#d6d6d6
| 241908 ||  || — || December 17, 2001 || Kitt Peak || Spacewatch || — || align=right | 3.5 km || 
|-id=909 bgcolor=#fefefe
| 241909 ||  || — || December 18, 2001 || Socorro || LINEAR || — || align=right | 1.4 km || 
|-id=910 bgcolor=#fefefe
| 241910 ||  || — || January 10, 2002 || Campo Imperatore || CINEOS || NYS || align=right | 2.3 km || 
|-id=911 bgcolor=#fefefe
| 241911 ||  || — || January 5, 2002 || Palomar || NEAT || — || align=right | 1.7 km || 
|-id=912 bgcolor=#fefefe
| 241912 ||  || — || January 9, 2002 || Socorro || LINEAR || — || align=right | 2.4 km || 
|-id=913 bgcolor=#E9E9E9
| 241913 ||  || — || January 9, 2002 || Socorro || LINEAR || — || align=right | 4.7 km || 
|-id=914 bgcolor=#d6d6d6
| 241914 ||  || — || January 9, 2002 || Socorro || LINEAR || URS || align=right | 6.5 km || 
|-id=915 bgcolor=#E9E9E9
| 241915 ||  || — || January 9, 2002 || Socorro || LINEAR || HNS || align=right | 2.2 km || 
|-id=916 bgcolor=#fefefe
| 241916 ||  || — || January 11, 2002 || Socorro || LINEAR || — || align=right | 3.0 km || 
|-id=917 bgcolor=#E9E9E9
| 241917 ||  || — || January 13, 2002 || Socorro || LINEAR || — || align=right | 1.9 km || 
|-id=918 bgcolor=#d6d6d6
| 241918 ||  || — || January 14, 2002 || Socorro || LINEAR || — || align=right | 4.7 km || 
|-id=919 bgcolor=#d6d6d6
| 241919 ||  || — || January 5, 2002 || Palomar || NEAT || — || align=right | 5.1 km || 
|-id=920 bgcolor=#fefefe
| 241920 ||  || — || January 8, 2002 || Socorro || LINEAR || — || align=right | 1.5 km || 
|-id=921 bgcolor=#fefefe
| 241921 ||  || — || January 8, 2002 || Socorro || LINEAR || — || align=right | 1.8 km || 
|-id=922 bgcolor=#fefefe
| 241922 ||  || — || January 21, 2002 || Desert Eagle || W. K. Y. Yeung || H || align=right | 1.2 km || 
|-id=923 bgcolor=#E9E9E9
| 241923 ||  || — || January 23, 2002 || Socorro || LINEAR || — || align=right | 3.8 km || 
|-id=924 bgcolor=#fefefe
| 241924 ||  || — || February 7, 2002 || Socorro || LINEAR || FLO || align=right | 1.1 km || 
|-id=925 bgcolor=#E9E9E9
| 241925 ||  || — || February 5, 2002 || Palomar || NEAT || DOR || align=right | 5.5 km || 
|-id=926 bgcolor=#fefefe
| 241926 ||  || — || February 5, 2002 || Haleakala || NEAT || — || align=right | 2.3 km || 
|-id=927 bgcolor=#fefefe
| 241927 ||  || — || February 6, 2002 || Socorro || LINEAR || — || align=right | 1.9 km || 
|-id=928 bgcolor=#fefefe
| 241928 ||  || — || February 6, 2002 || Socorro || LINEAR || — || align=right | 3.5 km || 
|-id=929 bgcolor=#fefefe
| 241929 ||  || — || February 7, 2002 || Socorro || LINEAR || — || align=right | 1.7 km || 
|-id=930 bgcolor=#E9E9E9
| 241930 ||  || — || February 7, 2002 || Socorro || LINEAR || HNS || align=right | 2.0 km || 
|-id=931 bgcolor=#fefefe
| 241931 ||  || — || February 11, 2002 || Desert Eagle || W. K. Y. Yeung || KLI || align=right | 2.7 km || 
|-id=932 bgcolor=#fefefe
| 241932 ||  || — || February 8, 2002 || Palomar || NEAT || — || align=right | 1.5 km || 
|-id=933 bgcolor=#fefefe
| 241933 ||  || — || February 3, 2002 || Haleakala || NEAT || — || align=right | 2.8 km || 
|-id=934 bgcolor=#E9E9E9
| 241934 ||  || — || February 6, 2002 || Socorro || LINEAR || — || align=right | 4.4 km || 
|-id=935 bgcolor=#E9E9E9
| 241935 ||  || — || February 7, 2002 || Socorro || LINEAR || PAD || align=right | 4.4 km || 
|-id=936 bgcolor=#fefefe
| 241936 ||  || — || February 7, 2002 || Socorro || LINEAR || MAS || align=right data-sort-value="0.85" | 850 m || 
|-id=937 bgcolor=#fefefe
| 241937 ||  || — || February 7, 2002 || Socorro || LINEAR || FLO || align=right data-sort-value="0.78" | 780 m || 
|-id=938 bgcolor=#fefefe
| 241938 ||  || — || February 7, 2002 || Socorro || LINEAR || — || align=right | 1.1 km || 
|-id=939 bgcolor=#E9E9E9
| 241939 ||  || — || February 7, 2002 || Socorro || LINEAR || GER || align=right | 2.0 km || 
|-id=940 bgcolor=#fefefe
| 241940 ||  || — || February 7, 2002 || Socorro || LINEAR || MAS || align=right data-sort-value="0.96" | 960 m || 
|-id=941 bgcolor=#fefefe
| 241941 ||  || — || February 8, 2002 || Socorro || LINEAR || — || align=right | 1.0 km || 
|-id=942 bgcolor=#E9E9E9
| 241942 ||  || — || February 8, 2002 || Socorro || LINEAR || JUN || align=right | 1.9 km || 
|-id=943 bgcolor=#E9E9E9
| 241943 ||  || — || February 8, 2002 || Socorro || LINEAR || — || align=right | 2.7 km || 
|-id=944 bgcolor=#B88A00
| 241944 ||  || — || February 10, 2002 || Socorro || LINEAR || Tj (2.59) || align=right | 17 km || 
|-id=945 bgcolor=#E9E9E9
| 241945 ||  || — || February 10, 2002 || Socorro || LINEAR || — || align=right | 4.8 km || 
|-id=946 bgcolor=#fefefe
| 241946 ||  || — || February 10, 2002 || Socorro || LINEAR || — || align=right | 2.2 km || 
|-id=947 bgcolor=#fefefe
| 241947 ||  || — || February 11, 2002 || Socorro || LINEAR || NYS || align=right data-sort-value="0.97" | 970 m || 
|-id=948 bgcolor=#E9E9E9
| 241948 ||  || — || February 7, 2002 || Kitt Peak || Spacewatch || — || align=right | 2.3 km || 
|-id=949 bgcolor=#E9E9E9
| 241949 ||  || — || February 8, 2002 || Anderson Mesa || LONEOS || NEM || align=right | 3.2 km || 
|-id=950 bgcolor=#d6d6d6
| 241950 ||  || — || February 17, 2002 || Needville || Needville Obs. || URS || align=right | 4.6 km || 
|-id=951 bgcolor=#E9E9E9
| 241951 ||  || — || February 19, 2002 || Socorro || LINEAR || — || align=right | 2.4 km || 
|-id=952 bgcolor=#E9E9E9
| 241952 ||  || — || February 19, 2002 || Socorro || LINEAR || — || align=right | 3.5 km || 
|-id=953 bgcolor=#fefefe
| 241953 ||  || — || February 20, 2002 || Socorro || LINEAR || CIM || align=right | 2.9 km || 
|-id=954 bgcolor=#fefefe
| 241954 ||  || — || March 10, 2002 || Socorro || LINEAR || — || align=right | 2.2 km || 
|-id=955 bgcolor=#fefefe
| 241955 ||  || — || March 12, 2002 || Socorro || LINEAR || CHL || align=right | 3.1 km || 
|-id=956 bgcolor=#C2FFFF
| 241956 ||  || — || March 12, 2002 || Palomar || NEAT || L4 || align=right | 11 km || 
|-id=957 bgcolor=#fefefe
| 241957 ||  || — || March 11, 2002 || Haleakala || NEAT || — || align=right | 1.3 km || 
|-id=958 bgcolor=#C2FFFF
| 241958 ||  || — || March 13, 2002 || Socorro || LINEAR || L4 || align=right | 13 km || 
|-id=959 bgcolor=#fefefe
| 241959 ||  || — || March 6, 2002 || Socorro || LINEAR || — || align=right | 1.6 km || 
|-id=960 bgcolor=#fefefe
| 241960 ||  || — || March 12, 2002 || Palomar || NEAT || — || align=right | 1.2 km || 
|-id=961 bgcolor=#E9E9E9
| 241961 ||  || — || March 15, 2002 || Palomar || NEAT || — || align=right | 1.4 km || 
|-id=962 bgcolor=#E9E9E9
| 241962 ||  || — || March 16, 2002 || Socorro || LINEAR || — || align=right | 3.4 km || 
|-id=963 bgcolor=#fefefe
| 241963 ||  || — || March 20, 2002 || Socorro || LINEAR || — || align=right | 1.6 km || 
|-id=964 bgcolor=#fefefe
| 241964 ||  || — || March 20, 2002 || Kitt Peak || Spacewatch || V || align=right data-sort-value="0.95" | 950 m || 
|-id=965 bgcolor=#E9E9E9
| 241965 ||  || — || March 20, 2002 || Kitt Peak || Spacewatch || — || align=right | 2.3 km || 
|-id=966 bgcolor=#fefefe
| 241966 ||  || — || April 9, 2002 || Palomar || NEAT || — || align=right | 2.5 km || 
|-id=967 bgcolor=#E9E9E9
| 241967 ||  || — || April 8, 2002 || Bergisch Gladbac || W. Bickel || — || align=right | 2.3 km || 
|-id=968 bgcolor=#E9E9E9
| 241968 ||  || — || April 14, 2002 || Desert Eagle || W. K. Y. Yeung || DOR || align=right | 3.3 km || 
|-id=969 bgcolor=#d6d6d6
| 241969 ||  || — || April 8, 2002 || Palomar || NEAT || NAE || align=right | 4.5 km || 
|-id=970 bgcolor=#fefefe
| 241970 ||  || — || April 10, 2002 || Socorro || LINEAR || — || align=right | 1.4 km || 
|-id=971 bgcolor=#d6d6d6
| 241971 ||  || — || April 11, 2002 || Anderson Mesa || LONEOS || EUP || align=right | 6.7 km || 
|-id=972 bgcolor=#d6d6d6
| 241972 ||  || — || April 12, 2002 || Palomar || NEAT || HYG || align=right | 5.6 km || 
|-id=973 bgcolor=#fefefe
| 241973 ||  || — || April 14, 2002 || Palomar || NEAT || — || align=right | 2.8 km || 
|-id=974 bgcolor=#E9E9E9
| 241974 ||  || — || April 16, 2002 || Socorro || LINEAR || — || align=right | 2.6 km || 
|-id=975 bgcolor=#E9E9E9
| 241975 ||  || — || May 8, 2002 || Socorro || LINEAR || KRM || align=right | 3.2 km || 
|-id=976 bgcolor=#fefefe
| 241976 ||  || — || May 8, 2002 || Socorro || LINEAR || — || align=right | 1.5 km || 
|-id=977 bgcolor=#fefefe
| 241977 ||  || — || May 9, 2002 || Socorro || LINEAR || V || align=right | 1.4 km || 
|-id=978 bgcolor=#fefefe
| 241978 ||  || — || May 11, 2002 || Socorro || LINEAR || — || align=right | 2.9 km || 
|-id=979 bgcolor=#E9E9E9
| 241979 ||  || — || May 11, 2002 || Socorro || LINEAR || — || align=right | 1.9 km || 
|-id=980 bgcolor=#d6d6d6
| 241980 ||  || — || May 15, 2002 || Palomar || NEAT || YAK || align=right | 5.0 km || 
|-id=981 bgcolor=#E9E9E9
| 241981 ||  || — || May 10, 2002 || Palomar || NEAT || — || align=right | 3.4 km || 
|-id=982 bgcolor=#E9E9E9
| 241982 ||  || — || May 15, 2002 || Palomar || NEAT || — || align=right | 3.5 km || 
|-id=983 bgcolor=#E9E9E9
| 241983 ||  || — || May 16, 2002 || Fountain Hills || Fountain Hills Obs. || — || align=right | 3.2 km || 
|-id=984 bgcolor=#E9E9E9
| 241984 ||  || — || June 1, 2002 || Palomar || NEAT || ADE || align=right | 3.5 km || 
|-id=985 bgcolor=#E9E9E9
| 241985 ||  || — || June 5, 2002 || Socorro || LINEAR || — || align=right | 1.8 km || 
|-id=986 bgcolor=#E9E9E9
| 241986 ||  || — || June 15, 2002 || Socorro || LINEAR || — || align=right | 2.1 km || 
|-id=987 bgcolor=#E9E9E9
| 241987 ||  || — || June 14, 2002 || Reedy Creek || J. Broughton || — || align=right | 1.7 km || 
|-id=988 bgcolor=#d6d6d6
| 241988 ||  || — || June 8, 2002 || Socorro || LINEAR || — || align=right | 6.3 km || 
|-id=989 bgcolor=#E9E9E9
| 241989 ||  || — || June 8, 2002 || Socorro || LINEAR || EUN || align=right | 2.0 km || 
|-id=990 bgcolor=#E9E9E9
| 241990 ||  || — || July 10, 2002 || Campo Imperatore || CINEOS || HOF || align=right | 3.4 km || 
|-id=991 bgcolor=#E9E9E9
| 241991 ||  || — || July 3, 2002 || Palomar || NEAT || MIT || align=right | 2.6 km || 
|-id=992 bgcolor=#E9E9E9
| 241992 ||  || — || July 9, 2002 || Socorro || LINEAR || — || align=right | 1.5 km || 
|-id=993 bgcolor=#E9E9E9
| 241993 ||  || — || July 14, 2002 || Socorro || LINEAR || — || align=right | 3.5 km || 
|-id=994 bgcolor=#d6d6d6
| 241994 ||  || — || July 14, 2002 || Palomar || NEAT || 3:2 || align=right | 7.8 km || 
|-id=995 bgcolor=#E9E9E9
| 241995 ||  || — || July 9, 2002 || Socorro || LINEAR || — || align=right | 1.5 km || 
|-id=996 bgcolor=#d6d6d6
| 241996 ||  || — || July 8, 2002 || Palomar || NEAT || — || align=right | 5.5 km || 
|-id=997 bgcolor=#E9E9E9
| 241997 ||  || — || July 4, 2002 || Palomar || NEAT || — || align=right | 1.4 km || 
|-id=998 bgcolor=#d6d6d6
| 241998 ||  || — || July 12, 2002 || Palomar || NEAT || VER || align=right | 4.5 km || 
|-id=999 bgcolor=#E9E9E9
| 241999 ||  || — || July 19, 2002 || Palomar || NEAT || EUN || align=right | 3.2 km || 
|-id=000 bgcolor=#E9E9E9
| 242000 ||  || — || July 18, 2002 || Socorro || LINEAR || — || align=right | 2.7 km || 
|}

References

External links 
 Discovery Circumstances: Numbered Minor Planets (240001)–(245000) (IAU Minor Planet Center)

0241